This is a list of products made by Yamaha Corporation. This does not include products made by Bösendorfer, which has been a wholly owned subsidiary of Yamaha Corporation since February 1, 2008.

For products made by Yamaha Motor Company, see the list of Yamaha motorcycles. Yamaha Motor Company shares the brand name but has been a separate company since 1955.

Musical instruments

Pianos
In 1900, Yamaha started to manufacture pianos.

Grand pianos

CF series 
 FC / CF 
 CFIII 
 CFIIIS 
 CF4 (2010–
 CF6 (2010–
 CFX (2010–)
C series 
 G1 / C1 / C1x 
 DC1A
 G2 / C2 /C2x 
 G2F / DG2FII
 C3 / C3x 
 #35 / G5 / new C5 / C5x 
 old C5 / C6 / C7 
 G7 / C7 / C7x 
 SC / CS 
G series

 G1, G2, G5, G7 
 #25 / G3 
 GA1E / DGA1[XG][E] 
 GC1 
 GC1S / GC1SG 
 GC1G / GC1FP 
 GC1M / DGC1 / DGC1ME3
 GC2 
 GH1 / GH1G
 GT7
A series 
 A1 
 A1[L][S][SG]
 DA1IIXG / DA1E3 / DA1M4
 EA1 
S series
 S4 
 S4BB
 DS4E3PRO PE
 S6 
 S6BB
 DS6E3PRO PE
 S400 
 S700E 
Z series
 Z1 
 Z1B

Baby grand pianos
 GB1 
 GB1K / DGB1CD — most compact models on current product line

Upright pianos

 B1
 B2
 B3
 C108
 M460
 M560
 P121
 P22
 P660
 SU118C
 T118
 T121
 U1
 U10
 U100
 U2
 U2M
 U3
 U30
 U300
 U5
 U7
 UX
 UX1
 UX10
 UX100
 UX3
 UX30
 UX300
 UX5
 UX50
 UX500
 YU116D/W
 YUA
 YUS1
 YUS3
 YUS5
 YUX
 SU7

Player pianos

 Disklavier
 Disklavier E3 series
disklavier control unit
 
 DKC-850 (MIDI recorder with PCM sound )
 EMR1 (MIDI recorder with PCM sound )

Silent pianos

silent piano system
 
 RSG-1 / RSG-3 / RSG-5 / RSG-10 / RSG-30 (2008, for U1/U3/-/UX10/b121/YF&b113)
ensemble unit
 RE-1 / RE-3 / RE-10 / RE-30 (1999, for U1/U3/UX10/W100)
silent ensemble unit
 RSE-1 / RSE-3 / RSE-10 (1999, for U1/U3/UX10)

Hybrid pianos

Hybrid grand pianos
 AvantGrand N1X 
 AvantGrand N3X 
 AvantGrand N3 
 AvantGrand N2 
 AvantGrand N1 
 DGP-5
 DGP-7

Hybrid upright pianos
 NU1X 
 NU1 
 DUP-8
 DUP-22B
 DUP-7 (2007)

Stage pianos

Electric pianos
Keyboards
Yet 233

CP series (electric grand)
 CP-60M (upright, with MIDI)
 CP-70
 CP-70B
 CP-70D (with 7band GEQ)
 CP-70M (with 7GEQ & MIDI)
 CP-80
 CP-80D (with 7band GEQ)
 CP-80M (with 7GEQ & MIDI)

Analog stage pianos

CP series (analog)
 CP-7 
 CP-10 
 CP-20 
 CP-30 
 CP-11 / CP-11W 
 CP-25 
 CP-35

Digital stage pianos

 GS1 / GS2  — 1st FM synth of Yamaha.
CP series (digital)
 CP1 
 CP4 
 CP5 
 CP33 
 CP40 
 CP50 
 CP73 (2019)
 CP88 (2019)
 CP300 

Reface series
 Reface CP 
Clavinova PF series
 PF10 / PF12 / PF15 
 PF50 / PF60 
 PF70 / PF80 
 PF85 
 PF-500 
 PF-1000 
 PF1200 / PF1500 / PF2000

Digital pianos

MODUS series
 Modus F01 
 Modus F11 
 Modus H01 
 Modus H11 
 Modus R01 

HEATED series
H-10

Clavinova series

 YP-10 / YP-20 / YP-30 , 1st generation
 YP-40 , 1st generation
 CWP-1 
Clavinova Grand (CGP/CVP-GP/CLP-GP)
 CGP-1000 
 CVP-309GP 
 CVP-409GP 
 CLP-175 , predecessor of CLP-295GP
 CLP-265GP 
 CLP-295GP 
Clavinova Ensemble (CVP)

 
 CVP-3 / CVP-5 / CVP-7 
 CVP-6 / CVP-8 / CVP-10 / CVP-100MA / CVP-100PE 
 CVP-20 
 CVP-30 / CVP-50 / CVP-70 
 CVP-35 / CVP-45 / CVP-55 / CVP-65 / CVP-75 
 CVP-25 
 CVP-83 / CVP-85 / CVP-87 
 CVP-85A
 CVP-83S[White] / CVP-87A[White]
 CVP-89 
 CVP-49 
 CVP-59[S] / CVP-69 / CVP-79 
 CVP-79A
 CVP-92 / CVP-94 / CVP-96 / CVP-98 
 CVP-600 
 CVP-103 [M] / CVP-105 / CVP-107 / CVP-109 
 CVP-700 
 CVP-201 
 CVP-203 / CVP-205 / CVP-207 / CVP-209 
 CVP-900 
 CVP-202 
 CVP-204 [C] / CVP-206 [M] 
 CVP-208 [M] / CVP-210 
 CVP-301 
 CVP-303 [C] / CVP-305 [C] / CVP-307 / CVP-309 [PE][PM] 
 CVP-401 [C][PE] / CVP-403 [C][PE][PM] / CVP-405 [PE][PM] / CVP-407 / CVP-409 [PE][PM] 
 CVP-501 / CVP-503 / CVP-505 [PE] / CVP-509 [PE][PM] 
 CVP-601 / CVP-605 / CVP-609 / CVP-609GP 
 CVP-701 / CVP-705 / CVP-709 / CVP-709GP 
 CVP-805 / CVP-809 / CVP-809GP 

Clavinova Traditional (CLP)

 
 CLP-20 / CLP-30 
 CLP-40 / CLP-45 / CLP-50 / CLP-55 / CLP-200 / CLP-300 
 CLP-100 / CLP-500 
 CLP-250 / CLP-350 / CLP-550 / CLP-650 
 CLP-570 / CLP-670 
 CLP-260 / CLP-360 / CLP-560 / CLP-760 
 CLP-121 / CLP-122 / CLP-123 / CLP-124 
 CLP-133 / CLP-134 / CLP-705 
 CLP-152S / CLP-153S / CLP-153SG / CLP-154S / CLP-155 / CLP-157 
 CLP-311 / CLP-611 / CLP-811 
 CLP-411 / CLP-511 / CLP-711 / CLP-911 
 CLP-555 
 CLP-810S 
 CLP-820 / CLP-840 / CLP-860[M] / CLP-870 / CLP-880[M][PE] 
 CLP-920 / CLP-930 / CLP-950[C][M] / CLP-970[C][M] 
 CLP-955 / CLP-970A[C][M] 
 CLP-910 / CLP-990[M] 
 CLP-110 
 CLP-120[C] / CLP-130 / CLP-150[C][M] / CLP-170[C][M][PE] (2002/2003(PE))
 CLP-115 
 CLP-175 
 CLP-220[PE] 
 CLP-230[C][M][PE] / CLP-240[C][M][PE] / CLP-270[C][M] / CLP-280[C][PE][PM] 
 CLP-320[C][M] / SCLP-320 / CLP-330[C][M][PE] / CLP-340[C][M][PE] / CLP-370[C][M][PE] / CLP-380[PE][PM] 
 CLP-430 / CLP-440 / CLP-470 / CLP-480 
 CLP-525 / CLP-535 / CLP-545 / CLP-565GP / CLP-575 / CLP-585 
 CLP-625 / CLP-635 / CLP-645 / CLP-665GP / CLP-675 / CLP-685 
 CLP-725 / CLP-735 / CLP-745 / CLP-765GP / CLP-775 / CLP-785 / CLP-795GP 
CLP-S series (spinet style similar to Modus F01/F11)
 Clavinova 610
 CLP-F01 
 CLP-S306[PE] / CLP-S308[PE] 
 CLP-S406 / CLP-S408 

Clavinova Smart Piano (CSP)
 
 CSP-150 [B][W][PE] 
 CSP-170 [B][W][PE]

P-series (stands for "portable")

 

 P-35 
 P-45 
 P50m 
 P-60[S] 
 P-65 
 P-70[S] 
 P-80[W] 
 P-85[S]
 P-90 
 P-95[S] 
 P-100  Clavinova PF series,
 P-105 * P-115 
 P-120[S] 
 P-121[S] 
 P-125 
 P-140[S] 
 P-150 
 P-155[S] 
 P-500 Clarinova Digital))
 P-155[B][S] 
 P-200 
 P-250 
 P-255 
 P-300  P500 features in P-100 chessis,
 P-500 
 P-515  
 P-S500

ARIUS/YDP series

 

 YDP-S30[C] / YDP-S31[C] 
 YDP-88 / YDP-88II 
 YDP-101 / YDP-201 
 YDP-103 
 YDP-113 
 YDP-121 
 YDP-123 / YDP-223[C] 
 YDP-131[C] 

 YDP-140[C] / YDP-160[C] 
 YDP-141[C] / YDP-161[C][B] / YDP-181 / YDP-V240 
 YDP-142 (2014, GHS) / YDP-162 (2014, GH)
 YDP-143 [R][B] (2016, GHS) / YDP-163 (2016, GH)
 YDP-144 (2019, GHS)/ YDP-164 (2019, GH3)
 YDP-145 (2022, GHS)/ YDP-165 (2022, GH3)
 YDP-S52 (2021, GHS)
 YDP-S34 (2019, GHS)/ YDP-S54 (2019,GH3) 
 YDP-151[C] / YDP-J151 
 YDP-184  
 YDP-200 
 YDP-213 
 YDP-223 
 YDP-300 
 YDP-321 
 YDP-323 

YPP series
 YPP-15 / YPP-33 
 YPP-35 
 YPP-45
 YPP-50
 YPP-55 
 YPP-100 
 YPP-200 
YPR series
 YPR-6 / YPR-8 
 YPR-7 / YPR-9 
 YPR-20 / YPR-30 
 YPR-50 
YPT series (this Series are Similar to The PSR 'E' Series. Only that it is A White Variation)
 YPT-200 
 YPT-210 

 YPT-210AD / YPT-210DI / YPT-210MS / YPT-210MSB

 YPT-220 
 YPT-230 
 YPT-240 
 YPT-255 
 YPT-260 
 YPT-270 
 YPT-300 
 YPT-310 
 YPT-310AD / YPT-310MS / YPT-310MSB
 YPT-320 
 YPT-330 
 YPT-340 
 YPT-360 
 YPT-370 
 YPT-400 
 YPT-410 
 YPT-420

J-series Digital Pianos
 J-3000 
 J-5000 
 J-7000 
 J-8000 
 J-9000

Piaggero/NP series portable digital piano

 NP-11
 NP-12 (2016)
 NP-30 / NP-30S 
 NP-31
 NP-32 (2016)
 NP-V60 / NP-V80

Portable Grand DGX / YPG series

 

 DGX-200 
 DGX-202 
 DGX-203 
 DGX-205 
 DGX-220 / YPG-225 
 DGX-230 / YPG-235  
 DGX-300 
 DGX-305 

 DGX-500 
 DGX-505 
 DGX-520 / YPG-525 
 DGX-530 / YPG-535  
 DGX-620 / YPG-625   
 DGX-630 [B][BP][P] / YPG-635   
 DGX-640 
 DGX-650 
 DGX-660 
 DGX-670 
Entertainment Series

 PSR-K1 
others
 N-100 
 PDP400
 PSR-GX76

Organs

Pump organs
In 1888, Yamaha started to manufacture their pump organs in the form of reed organs.

In 1921, Yamaha acquired Nishikawa & Sons in Yokohama after the death of its founder, and continued to manufacture Nishikawa organs and pianos until 1936.

Magna organ (1934)

Magna Organ introduced in 1935, was a multi-timbral keyboard instrument invented in 1934 by a Yamaha engineer, Sei-ichi Yamashita.
It was a kind of electro-acoustic instruments,  i.e. the acoustic instrument with additional electronic circuits for sound modification; especifically Magna Organ was an electric-fan driven free reed organ with the microphone sealed in the soundproof box, instead of electrostatic pickups used on the electrostatic reed organs.
Early design of Magna Organ was a kind of the additive-synthesizer that summing-up the partials generated by the frequency-multipliers. However, it seems difficult to achieve polyphony without intermodulation distortions with the technology of the 1930s. According to the additional patents and the reviews at that time, its later design finally implemented, seems to had shifted to the sound-colorization system using the  combinations of set of free reeds, microphones and loudspeakers.

Note that, similar type of instruments using the pairs of free reed and microphone sealed in the double-soundproof boxes, were later re-commercialized as Croda Organ in 1959 by Tōyō Denshi Gakki Kenkyūjo (In English: Tōyō Electronic Musical Instrument Laboratory) in Tokyo.

Electronic organs

The most models and years of introductions are based on official chronicle. Also, the photograph of major models on each era is available on the 50th anniversary site.
Prototype Electone
 E-T (1958, prototype concept model)
 ET-5 (May 1959, Improved version of E-T Prototype)
 EM-6 (May 1959, Single-stage keyboard prototype)
1st Electone
 D-1 (1959–1962, electronic organ products)
Stage models

 EX-21 (1968, prototype of EX-42)
 EX-42 (1970–1977, stage model, design origin of GX-1)
 SY-1 (1971, solo part of GX-1, monophonic synth with initial/after touch)
 SY-2 (1971)
 GX-1 (1973 to 1982, polyphonic synth)
 EX-1 / EX-2 (1977–1983)
 FX-1 (1983–1988, FM synthesis)
 HX System1 (1987–1992)
 HX-1 / HX-1S (1987/1989, AWM(PCM)+FM)
 ELX-1 / ELX-1m (1992/2000)
Number series
 305 / 315 (1979, export model)
 405 / 415 (1980, U.S. models of the D-65 / D-85)
 6000 (1981, export model)
 7000 (1982, export model)
A series

 A-2 (1960–1963)
 A-3 (1966, red combo organ, forerunner of YC series)
 A-40 / A-60 (1977, export model)
 A-45 / A-55 (1978, export model)
 A-505 (1982, export model)
AR series
 AR-80 (1997, export model)
 AR-100 (1996, export model)
B series
 B-1 (1961–1962)
 B-3 (1964–1965)
 B-5 (1965–1969)
 B-6 (1966, export model)
 B-7 / B-7D (1967, export model)
 B-2 / B-6B (1968–1971)
 B-6E / B-12 / B-12R (1970, export model)
 B-2B / B-4 / B-5A / B-6D / B-10A (1971–1973...1978(B-4))
 B-4B / B-5BR / B-6ER / B10AR / B-20R (1971, export model)
 B-4C / B-4CR / B-10BR / B-30R (1972, export model)
 B-6R / B-10R (1972–1974/1975)
 B-5CR (1973, export model)
 B-2R (1974, export model)
 B-11 / B-20 / B-30 / B-30T / B-50 / B-50T (1974–1975...1978(B-30))
 B-20CR / B-30AR / B-40R / B-50R (1976, export model)
 B-40 / B-45 / B-60 (1977, export model)

 B-35 / B-55 / B-75 (1978, export model)
 B-70 (1979–1982)
 B-101 / B-102 / B-103 (1982–1984)
 B-204 / B-405 / B-605 / B-805 (1982, export model)
 BK-2 (1975, export model)
 BK-4 / BK-7 (1973, export model)
 BK-4C / BK-5C / BK-20C (1976, export model)
 BK-5 (1974)
 BK-6 (1971, export model)
 BK-10 (1976–1978)
 BK-20A (1972, export model)
 BK-30 / BK-50 (1975–1978)
C series

 C-1 (1964–1966)
 C-2 / C-2S (1966–1967)
 C-1B / C-2B (1967–1971)
 C-4 / C-5A (1971–1973/1974)
 C-4R / C-5R (1972–1974/1975)
 C-10T (1973–1975)
 C-10 / C-10H / C-30 / C-30H / C-30T / C-50 / C-50T (1974–1975)
 C-40 / C-60 (1977, export model)
 C-35 / C-35i (1978, export model)
 C-80 / C-90 (1979–1982)
 C-100 / C-200 / C-300 / C-400 (1978–1981/1982(C-300))
 C-201 / C-301 / C-401 / C-501 (1982–1983/1984(C-301))
 C-405 / C-605 (1982, export model)
 C-35N / C-55N (1982, export model)
 CK-10 (1975–1978)
 CK-30 / CK-50 (1976–1978)
 CN-50 (1979, export model)
 CSY-1 (1974–1975)
 CSY-2 (1975, export model)
D series

 D-1 (1959–1962)
 D-1B (1962)
 D-2 (1962, export model)
 D-2B (1967–1971)
 D-3 (1971–1972)
 D-3R / D-10 (1971–1975)
 D-7 (1969–1972)
 D-7R (1969, export model)
 D-20 / D-30 (1975–1977)
 D-30E (1976, export model)
 D-40 / D-60 / D-90 (1977–1980)
 D-65 / D-85 (1980, export model)
 D-80 (1977, export model)
 D-600 / D-700 / D-800 (1980–1981/1983)
 D-500 (1983)
 DK-40A (1972, export model)
 DK-40C (1976, export model)
E series
 E-1 (1962–1966)
 E-2 (1966–1968)
E-3 (1968–1972)
 E-3R (1970)
 E-5 (1971, export model)
 E-5AR (1973, export model)
 E-10 (1975–1977)
 E-10AR (1972, export model)
 E-20 (1972–1977)
 E-30 / E-50 / E-70 (1977–1980/1981)
 E-70 (1977–1981, PASS)
 E-45 / E-75 (1981, export model)
 E-500 / E-700 (1981–1982/1983)
EL series (AWM(PCM) + FM)

 EL-7
 EL-15
 EL-17 (1995–2002)
 EL-20 (1993–2000)
 EL-25
 EL-27 (1993–2000)
 EL-37 (1994–2000)
 EL-30 (1991–1996)
 EL-40
 EL-50 (1991–1996)
 EL-57 (1996–1999)
 EL-70 (1991–1996)
 EL-87 / EL-87W (1995–1999)
 EL-90 (1991–1998)
 EL-100 (2002–2006)
 EL-200 (2000–2002)
 EL-400 (2000–2006)
 EL-500 (1999–2003)
 EL-700 (1999–2003)
 EL-900 (1998–2003)
 EL-900B (2002–2003)
 EL-900m (2000–2003)
 ELA-1 (2022)
 ELK-10 (1994–2001)
 ELK-400 (2001–2006)
 ELX-1 (1992–2000)
 ELX-1m (2000–2005)

Stagea series
 ELB-01 / ELB-01K (2006–2015)
 ELS-01 / ELS-01C (2004–2014)
 ELS-01X (2005–2014)
 ELS-01U / ELS-01CU / ELS-01XU (2009–)
 ELS-02 / ELS-02C / ELS-02X (2014-)
 ELB-02 (2015-)
 ELC-02 (2016-)
Stagea D-Deck series
 DDK-7 (2006, Stagea with portable keyboard style)
F series
 F-1 (1964–1979)
 F-2 (1966–1975)
F series console organ
 F-30 / F-70 / F-50 (1981–1988)
 F-5 / F-15 / F-25 / F-35 / F-45 / F-55 (1984, export model)
 F-100 / F-200 (1994–2000)
 F-300 / F-400 (1992–2000/1996)
 F-700 (1989)
FC/FE/FS/FX series (FM synthesis)
 FC-10 / FC-20 (1984–1986)
 FE-30 / FE-40 / FE-50 / FE-50M / FE-50MB / FE-60 / FE-70 (1984–1986/1987)
 FS-20 / FS-30 / FS-30M / FS-50 / FS-70 (1983–1986...1988(FS-30M))
 FS-30A (1986–1987)
 FS-100 / FS-200 / FS-300 / FS-500 (1983, export model)
 FX-1 / FX-3 / FX-10 / FX-20 (1983–1987/1988)

HA/HC/HE/HK/HS/HX series (AWM(PCM) + FM)
 HA-10 (1988–2001, 1manual)
 HC-1 / HC-3 (1989–1994/1993)
 HE-5 (1988–1994)
 HK-10 (1988–1995)
 HS-4 / HS-5 / HS-6 / HS-7 / HS-8 (1987–1992)
 HX System1 (1987–1992)
 HX-3 / HX-5 (1987–1992)
 HX-1S (1989)
 CHX-1 (1987, export model)
MC Series
 MC-200 / MC-400 / MC-600
ME series
 ME-400 / ME-600 (1985–1987)
 ME-15 / ME-35 / ME-55 (1986–1989, portable keyboard style)
MR series
 MR-1 (1983, export model, single manual)
T series
 T-30 / T-60 (1966)
US series
 US-1 (1988, export model)
 US-1000 (1988, export model, single manual)

Combo organs

 A-3 (1966)
YC series
 YC-10 (1969)
 YC-20 (1970)
 YC-30 (1970)
 YC-25D (1972)
 YC-45D (1972)

Reface series (digital)
 Reface YC

Ensemble keyboards

 SS30 (1977, string ensemble)
 CE20 / CE25 (1982) — cost down preset version of FM synth GS1 / GS2.
 SY20 (1982, ensemble synthesizer for classroom)
SK series
 SK10 (1979, organ/string/brass)
 SK15 (1981, organ/poly-synth/string)
 SK20 (1980, organ/poly-synth)
 SK30 (1980, organ/poly-synth/solo-synth)
 SK50D (1980, 2 manuals organ/poly-synth/solo-synth/bass)

Synthesizers
 Magna organ (1935–?) — See #Magna Organ.

GX
 GX-1 (1973/1975–1982) — 1st polyphonic synthesizer of Yamaha, released as Electone electronic organ

SY series
 SY-1 (1974, solo part of GX-1, monophonic synth with initial/after touch)
 SY-2 (c. 1975, a successor of SY-1)
 for the workstations, see below

CS series (monophonic)
 CS-01 (1982, shoulder keyboard, with breath controller)
 CS-5 (1978)
 CS-10 (1977)
 CS-15 (1978, monophonic dual channel)
 CS-15D (1978, monophonic dual channel)
 CS-20M (1979, monophonic, patch memory)
 CS-30 / CS30L (1977, monophonic dual modules, L = live performance version without analog seq.)
CS series (polyphonic)
 CS-40M (1979, 2-voice, patch memory)
 CS-50 (1977, 4-voice)
 CS-60 (1977, 8-voice)
 CS-70M (1981, 6-voice dual channel, patch memory, polyphonic seq.)
 CS-80 (1976, 8-voice dual channel)

DX/TX series

 DX1 (1983, dual DX7 with display)
 DX5 (1985, dual DX7)
 DX7 / DX7S (1983/1987)
 DX7IID / DX7IIFD (1986)
 DX7IIFD centennial / DX7IIC (1987)
 DX9 (1983, 4op FM)
 DX11 (1987, 4op FM)

 TX816 — clustering rack version of 8× DX7
 
 TX7 (1985) — desktop module version of DX7
 TX802 — rack mount version of DX7II except for unison 
 
 TX81Z (1987) — rack mount versions of DX11

 DX21 (1985, 4op FM)
 DX27 / DX27S / SDX27S (1985/1986/1986, S = speakers, SDX = classroom model ?)
 DX100 (1985, 4op FM, DX27 with mini keyboard)

VL/VP series (virtual acoustic)
 VL1  / VL1m (1993/1994, Self oscillation/Virtual Acoustic synthesizer)
 VL7  / VL70m (1994/1996, cost down version of VL1/VL1m)
 VP1 (1994, Free oscillation/Virtual Acoustic synthesizer)

CSx/ANx series (virtual analog / sample-based synthesis)
 AN1x (1997, virtual analog)
 CS1x (1996, similar to MU50. AWM2 engine, sample-based synthesis.)
 CS2x (1998, similar to MU90 except for insertion effects. AWM2 engine.)
 CS6x / CS6R (1999, support MSPS. AWM2 engine.)

S series
 S03[BL] / S03SL (2001/2004, BL = black, SL = silver)
 S08 (2002, extended version of S03, support XG and GM2)
 S30 (2000, based on CS6x)
 S70 XS (2009, based on Motif XS without sequencer and sampler)
 S80 (1999, based on CS6x)
 S90 (2002, based on Motif 8 without sequencer and sampler)
 S90ES (2005, based on Motif 8 ES without sequencer and sampler, support MSPS)
 S90XS (2009, based on Motif XS without sequencer and sampler)
 MX49 / MX61 (2012) - successor to MM6/MM8, with more than 1000 sounds from Motif XS 
 MX88 (2017)
Reface series
 Reface CS (2015, 8 voice (single multimode oscillator per voice), virtual analog synthesizer based on the CS series)
 Reface DX (2015, 8 Voice, 4 op fm based on the DX series)

Music workstations

V series
 V50 (1989, music workstation, successor of DX11)
SY series (AFM/PCM/RCM(PCM×AFM))

 SY22 (1990) — AWM2 and FM-based Vector synthesis
 SY35 (1992) — AWM2 and FM-based Vector synthesis
 SY55 (1990) — PCM-only (AWM2), without Sample RAM (like SY77)
 SY77 (1989) — RCM synthesis
 SY85 (1992) — PCM-only (AWM2), with Sample RAM
 SY99 (1991) — RCM synthesis

 TG33 (1990) — rack mount version of SY22
 TG55 (1989) — rack mount version of SY55
 TG500 (1992) — rack mount version of SY85
 TG77 (1990)— rack mount version of SY77
 FS1R (1998) — FM and formant synthesis

W series
 W5 / W5 ver.2 (1994/1995)
 W7 / W7 ver.2 (1994/1995) — 61-key, AWM2 synthesis
EX series
 EX5 / EX5S / EX5R (1998)
 EX7 (1998)
Motif/MO/MM series
 Motif 6/7/8 (2001)
 Motif-Rack (2002)
 Motif ES 6/7/8 (2003)
 Motif-Rack ES (2004)
 MO6 / MO8 / SDX-4000 (SDX = classroom keyboard based on MO6S) (2005)
 MM6 / MM8 (2007/2008) - successor to EOS B2000
 Motif XS 6/7/8  (2007)
 Motif-Rack XS (2008)
 Motif XF (2010)
 MOX6 / MOX8 (2011) - with the sound engine and sample-ROM from Motif XS, half polyphony, no sampler
 MOXF6 / MOXF8 (2013) - sound engine and sample-ROM from Motif XF, optional sample-flash-ROM
 Motif XF6/XF7/XF8 WH (2014) - 40th Anniversary, special edition MOTIF XF white
Montage series
 Montage 6/7/8 (2016)
 MODX 6/7/8 (2018)
 Montage 6/7/8 WH (2019) - white edition
 MODX+ 6/7/8 (2022)
Others
 QS300 (1995) — music workstation similar to EOSB900, based on QY300+MU50

Arranger workstations

Tyros series (The 'S' Series are counterparts of Tyros)
 Tyros (1 May 2002)
 Tyros2 (21 June 2005)
 Tyros3 (17 April 2008)
 Tyros4 (16 June 2010)
 Tyros5 (13 July 2013)

Genos series (The 'SX' Series are Based On the Genos)

 Genos (31 August 2017)

PSR arranger workstations (before PSR-S series)

 PSR-1500 (21 January 2004)
 PSR-3000 (21 January 2004)
 PSR-7000 (1995, export model)
 PSR-6000
 PSR-5700 
 PSR-8000 (8 September 1997, export model)
 PSR-9000 (9 September 1999, export model)
 PSR-9000 Pro (2000, export model)
 PSR-640
 PSR-1000 (2001,export model)
 PSR-740
 PSR-1100 (2002,export model)
 PSR-2000 (2001,export model)
 PSR-2100 (2002,export model)

PSR-S Series
 PSR-S500 (18 July 2006)
 PSR-S550Si / PSR-S550Bl (The S550Si was exported in many countries as a silver version of the Black S550) 
 PSR-S650 (13 September 2010)
 PSR-S700 (8 May 2006)
 PSR-S710 (5 February 2009)
 PSR-S900 (8 May 2006)
 PSR-S910 (5 February 2009)
 PSR-S750 (26 April 2012)
 PSR-S950 (26 April 2012)
 PSR-S670 (25 February 2015)
 PSR-S770 (25 February 2015)
 PSR-S970 (25 February 2015)
 PSR-S775 (1 January 2018)
 PSR-S975 (1 January 2018)

PSR-SX Series (Replaces the PSR-S Series)
 PSR-SX (Replaces the PSR-S series)
 PSR-SX900 (1 June 2019)
 PSR-SX700 (1 June 2019)
 PSR-SX600 (13 September 2020)

Oriental Arranger Workstations
 PSR-A1000 (2002, Oriental version of Yamaha PSR-1100)
 PSR-OR700 (2007, oriental version of Yamaha PSR-S700)
 PSR-A2000 (2012, Oriental model and black version of Yamaha PSR S710)
 PSR-A3000 (2016, Oriental version based on Yamaha PSR-S770 and first A Series to have multiple colours in the board)
 PSR-A5000 (2021, Oriental version based on Yamaha PSR SX700)

Workstations

 MU5 (1994)
 MU15 (1998)
 QR10 (c. 1993, Music Accompaniment Player with sampler and speaker)
 QY8 (1994)
 QY10 (1990)
 QY20 (1992)
 QY22 (1995)
 QY70 (1997)(AWM2 engine)
 QY100 (2000)(AWM2 engine)
 QY300 (c. 1994)
 QY700 (1996)
 V50

Groove machines

 AN200 (2001) — desktop module based on PLG150-AN similar to AN1x, with drum sound and step sequencer.
 DX200 (2001) — desktop module based on PLG150-DX compatible with DX7, with additional filter & envelope, drum sounds and step sequencer.
 PSRD1 / PSRD1-DJX (1998, DJ keyboard)
 DJX-II / DJX-IIB (2000, DJ keyboard/DJ groove machine)
 RM1x (1998)
 RS7000 (2001)
 RX5 (1986)
 RX7 (1987)

Drum machines

RX series
 RX5 (1986)
 RX7 (1987)
 RX8 (1988, 43 samples)
 RX11 (1984)
 RX15 (1984)
 RX17 (1987)
 RX21 / RX21L (1985, L = Latin percussion)
 RX120 (1988, 38 samples)
RY series
 RY8 (1994)
 RY9 (1999)
 RY10 (1992)
 RY20 (1994)
 RY30 (1991, AWM2(16bit PCM))
RM series
 RM50 (1993) - drum sound module
MR series
 MR10 (1983)
DD series
 DD5 (c. 1989)
 DD10

PTX series

 PTX8 (1986) Percussion Tone Generator

TXM series

TMX (1992) Drum Trigger Module

Samplers

 TX16W (1987)
VSS series (mini keyboard)
 VSS-30 (1987)
 VSS-100 (1985)
 VSS-200 (1988 or 1989)
A series (rack mount)
 A3000 / A3000 ver.2 (1997)
 A4000 (1999)
 A5000 (1999)
 A7000 / A7000 ver.2 (1995)
SU series (desktop module)
 SU10 (1995)
 SU200 (2000)
 SU700 (1998)

Sound modules
 
 CBXT3 — General MIDI and other modes supported
 FB-01 — (1986) 4op FM/8 multi-timbral sound module, suitable for CX5M system. a forerunner of TG & MU series
 FS1R (1998) — FM/Formant synthesis
 TG100 (1991) — General MIDI sound module
 TG300 / TG300GRAY (1993/1994) — PCM, GS compatible
 TG500 (1992)
 TX1P (1987, piano)

XG sound modules
MU series

 MU5
 MU10
 MU15 (1995)
 MU50 (1995, half-rack unit)
 MU80 (1994/1996)
 MU90/ MU90R / MU90B
 MU100 / MU100R / MU100B / MU100BS (1997/?/1998/1999)
 MU128 (1998)
 MU500 (2000)
 MU1000 (1999)
 MU2000 / MU2000EX (1999/)

Plug-in sound boards

 DB50XG (1995) — XG sound daughter-board for Wave Blaster port
 DB51XG (1998?) — XG sound daughter-board for Wave Blaster port, smaller footprint than DB50XG, main processor is XU94700 (a very big chip)
 DB60XG (?) — XG sound daughter-board for Wave Blaster port with audio-in (like SW60XG), only for Japan
 NEC XR385 (?) — OEM/Licensed? XG sound board for (unknown) karaoke machine, audio inputs are suitable for microphone instead of line levels
Modular Synthesis Plug-in System
 MSPS plug-in sound board, supported by Motif series, MU series, S series, CS6x/CS6R, etc.
 PLG150-AN — Analog physical modeling synthesis, similar to AN1x
 PLG150-AP — sampling grand piano, based on Yamaha NEW CFIIIS
 PLG150-DR — drum sound, equivalent to drum part of Motif
 PLG100-DX — plug-in board version of DX7
 PLG150-DX — successor of PLG100-DX, compatible with DX7
 PLG150-PC — percussion sound, based on Latin Groove Factory/Q Up Arts
 PLG150-PF — PCM piano sound
 PLG150-SG — formant synging synthesizer, forerunner of Vocaloid
 PLG100-VH — vocoder / harmonizer board
 PLG100-VL — plug-in board version of VL70m
 PLG150-VL — successor of PLG100-VL, similar to VA algorithm on EX5
 PLG100-XG — XG sound, based on MU50/MU100
 SW60SG (1996), an ISA version

Software synthesizers

 BODiBEAT
 MIDPLUG (1997)
 S-YG20
 S-YXG50 (1997)
 S-YXG70
 S-YXG100
 S-YXG100 PVL
 VOCALOID
 VOCALOID2
 VOCALOID3
 VOCALOID4

MIDI controllers
KX series
 KX25 (2008)
 KX49 (2008)
 KX61 (2008)
 KX8 (2008, GHS action)
 KX76 (1985, initial/after touch)
 KX88 (1984, piano touch, initial/after touch)
CBX series
 CBX-K1 / CBX-K1XG (1995, XG = XG sound)
 CBX-K2 (1998)
 CBX-K3 (1993)

Keytars

 CS-01 (1982, shoulder analog synth with breath controller)
 KX-1 (1983)
 KX-5 (1984)
 SHS-10[R][S][B] (1987/1988, FM & MIDI, similar to PSS-390, R = red, S = silver, B = black (1988))
 SHS-200 (1988)

Guitar synthesizers
 G10 (1988, guitar MIDI Controller (using super sonic sensor)/Sound module, compatible with TX802/TX81Z)
 G1D (1996, HEX pickup)
 G50 (1996, guitar MIDI converter for G1D/B1D/B5D)
 B1D / B5D (1997/?, bass HEX pickup)

EZ series guitar style
 EZ-EG (2002 or 2003, EZ series, electric guitar style, 6strings, 12frets)
 EZ-AG (2003 or 2005, EZ series, acoustic guitar style, 6strings, 12frets)

Wind controllers

WX series
 WX5 (1998)
 WX7 (1987)
 WX11 / WT11 (1989, Wind controller/sound module)

The Yamaha WX5, WX11, and WX7 are models of monophonic MIDI wind controller musical instruments manufactured by the Yamaha Corporation that have since been discontinued. The fingering system is based on the saxophone basic fingering.  Like a keyboard controller, wind controllers send MIDI note information electronically to an external sound module or tone generator which in turn synthesizes a tremendous variety of musical tones. Unlike a keyboard controller which is usually polyphonic, a wind controller is monophonic. The only limits to the kinds of sounds available are the limitations of the external module/tone generator, not the WX5 itself.  A WX5 performer can sound like any melodic instrument:  wind, string, percussion, keyboard, or purely electronic, including special sound effects.  In addition most tone generators a mix of instruments can be programmed.

The WX5 wind controller simulates a wind instrument because of the way it is played, the key layout, and because it responds to breath (wind) pressure as well as lip pressure on a simulated reed mouthpiece similar to that of a saxophone or clarinet. The wind and lip pressure information is converted to MIDI data which is interpreted by the external sound module.  Usually the wind pressure is interpreted as loudness and lip pressure is interpreted as pitch bend; thus, the instrument responds much like an acoustic wind instrument and extremely realistic musical phrasing is available to the player.

The WX5 has a 16-key layout similar to a standard saxophone. It also includes a built-in MIDI output connector, a dedicated connector and cable for direct connections to Yamaha WX-Series tone generators, a high-resolution wind sensor, and a thumb-controlled pitch bend wheel. Yamaha recommend that this device be used with the Yamaha VL70m Virtual Acoustic Tone Generator.

The WX7 was the first model that Yamaha produced, beginning in 1987.  This was followed by the WX11 in 1993, and then the WX5 in 1999—2001.  The WX5 was discontinued in October 2017.

Note: the 1993 date for introduction of the WX11 is in doubt. On the 1991 CD release "Love In" by the Australian band "The Freaked Out Flower Children" (Discogs: https://www.discogs.com/release/4281005) Sophie Lee is credited as playing the WX11.

=References=
 Electric Wind Music
 MIDI Electronic Wind Instrument: A Study of the Instrument and Selected Works

EZ series wind instruments
 EZ-TP (2004, EZ series, trumpet style, 3valves)

Breath controllers
 BC2
 BC3

Tenori-on

 TNR-W (2008, white LED buttons)
 TNR-O (2009, orange LED buttons)

Wearable Instruments
 Miburi

Interfaces

MIDI interfaces
 UX16
 UX96
 UX256
 MI-3100 for the Toshiba 3100

MIDI effects
 MEP4 (c. 1988) MIDI Event Processor

MLAN

 mLAN8P
 mLAN8E
 mLAN16E
 mLAN-EX
 i88X

Music sequencers
 QX1 (1984)
 QX3 (1987)
 QX5 / QX5FD (1986/1988 or 1989)
 QX7 (1985)
 QX21 (1985)

Music data recorders
 
MDF series
 
 MDF1 (1986, media: 2.8-inch Quick Disk)
 MDF2 (media: 3.5-inch 2D FD)
 MDF3 (media: 3.5-inch 2HD FD)
DSR series
 DSR-1 (1987, digital sequencer recorder)
MDR series
 MDR-1
 MDR3
 MDR4
 MDR-10

Music data player
 MDP-30 (2008, music data player for accompaniment/lesson, PCM sound:XG/GM2/GS, USB memory/USB FDD ready)

Music computers
 C1 / C1/20 (1987) — 
 CX5M / CX5F (1984) — 
 CX7M/128 (1985)—

Music software
 MA-63W (1999, XGworks V3.0 for windows 95/98)

Computer music packages
Hello! Music!
 
 CBX-101 (1992)
 CBX-201 (1992)
 CBX-302 (1993)
 CBX-S3 (1993, stereo speaker)
 CBX-T3 (1993, tone generator with MIDI I/F)
 CBX-PCC10 (1996, unknown)

Classroom keyboards
 SY20 (1982, ensemble synthesizer for classroom)
 SDX27S (1986, classroom version of DX27S)
Hello! Music! for Education
 SDX-2000 (1989, classroom keyboard based on EOS B200)
 SDX-3000 (1995, classroom keyboard based on EOS B900)
 SDX-4000 (classroom keyboard based on MO6S)

Portable keyboards
TYU series
 
 TYU-30 Fun-Keyboard (mini KB, squarewave tone)
 TYU-40 (mini KB, squarewave tone, pitchbender & microphone)

PortaSound

 PS-1 / PS-2 / PS-3 (1980, mini KB)
 PS-10 / PS-20 / PS-30 / PS-30B (1981/1982, 44-48key)
 PS-300 / PS-400 (1982, mini KB)
 MP-1 (1982, mini KB, with built-in musical score printer)
 PS-25 / PS-35 / PS-35S (1983, S = stereo speakers)
 PS-55 / PS-55S (1983, S = stereo speakers, CPU Intel 8085, Waveform Synth IG09510)
 MK-100 (1983, mini KB, digital sound)
 PS-200 (1984, mini KB)
 PS-6100 (1984)

PortaSound PlayCard series
 

 PC-50 (1983, mini KB)
 PC-100 (1982, mini KB)
 PC-1000 (1983)
 PCS-30 / PCS-500 (1984)
 PCR-800 (1985)

PortaSound PSS series 

 PSS-6 (1994, sample)
 PSS-7 (1997, ellipse shape body; wavetable (or sample) with granular sounds)
 PSS-8 (1988)
 PSS-9 (1990)
 PSS-11 / PSS-21 / PSS-31 / PSS-51 (1992, sample)
 PSS-12 (1994)
 PSS-14 (1997, wavetable (or sample) with granular sounds)
 PSS-15 (1997)
 PSS-16 (FM, acc.&demo) (1990) 
 PSS-20 (1989)
 PSS-26 (1995)
 PSS-30 (1982)
 PSS-50 (1990, FM with realitime sliders)
 PSS-51 (1992)
 PSS-80 / PSS-80R / PSS-100 / PSS-280 / PSS-380 / PSS-580 / PSS-780 (1989, R = red)
 PSS-102 / PSS-104 (1991, with music card, music cartridge (PSS-102) and microphone)
 PSS-110 / PSS-150 / PSS-260 / PSS-450 (1985, squarewave/squarewave/digital/?)
 PSS-125 (8 voice polyphony, 32 Keys, squarewave)
 PSS-120 / PSS-160 (1986)

 PSS-130 (1987)
 PSS-140 37-keys 100-sounds, YM2413 / PSS-480 / PSS-680 (1988, FM&acc)
 PSS-170 44-keys 100-sounds, YM2413 (1986)
 PSS-190 / PSS-290 /  / PSS-590 / PSS-790 (1990, FM with realtime sliders)
 PSS-270 49-keys 100-sounds, YM2413 (1986, two FM operators, nine voice polyphony), XC194AO
 PSS-280 (1986, reduced feature version of PSS-270)
 PSS-360 (1986, squarewave)
 PSS-370 (1987)
 PSS-390 (1990)
 PSS-401 (c. 1985, 44-key edition of PS-300, with additional octave control, reduced rhythm section)
 PSS-460 49-keys 21-sounds, YM3812, (1986)
 PSS-470 49-keys 21-sounds, YM3812, (1987)
 PSS-560 49-keys 21-sounds, YM3812, additional drum chip (1986)
 PSS-570 49-keys 21-sounds, YM3812, additional drum chip (1987)
 PSS-680 (FM, MIDI & drum pads) (1988)
 PSS-780 (FM, MIDI & drum pads) (1989)
 PSS-790 (1990)
 PSS-795 (1990)
 PSS-A50/PSS-F30/PSS-E30 (2020)

HandySound
 HS-200 / HS-400 / HS-500 / HS-501 (1982, extra mini KB)

PortaTone

PortaTone DSR series
 DSR-500 (1988)
 DSR-1000 (c. 1987)
 DSR-2000 (c. 1987)

PortaTone PSR series
PSR

 PSR-2 (1990)
 PSR-3 (1991)
 PSR-6 49-keys 100-sounds YM2413 chip (1989)
 PSR-7 49-keys 40-sounds (1989)
 PSR-11 49-keys 16-sounds, YM3812 chip, (1986)
 PSR-12 49-keys 32-sounds, YM3812 chip, (1987)
 PSR-15 (1984)
 PSR-16 (1988)
 PSR-18 / PSR-28 / PSR-38 / PSR-48 (1990)
 PSR-19 (1990)
 PSR-21 (1986)
 PSR-22 / PSR-32 (1987)
 PSR-27 / PSR-37 / PSR-47 (1989)
 PSR-31 61-keys 16-sounds, YM3812, additional chip for drums (1991)
 PSR-32 61-keys 32-sounds, YM3812, additional chip for drums (1987)
 PSR-36 (1988)
 PSR-40 / PSR-50 (1985)
 PSR-62, (1985) / oriental model.
 PSR-60, contains YM2154 rhythm chip, (1985)
 PSR-70, contains YM2154 rhythm chip, (1985)
 PSR-73 (1991)
 PSR-74 (1999)
 PSR-75 (1992)
 PSR-76 (1994)
 PSR-77 (1995)
 PSR-78 (1996)
 PSR-79 (1998)
 PSR-80, contains YM2414 (fm) and YM2154 (rhythm) chips (1987)
 PSR-90 (1987)
 PSR-85 (1994)
 PSR-100 (1991)
 PSR-110 (1993)
 PSR-125 (2002)
 PSR-130 (1997)
 PSR-140 / PSR-140PC (1999)
 PSR-150 (1992)
 PSR-160 (2000, export model)
 PSR-170 (2001 or 2002)
 PSR-172 (2003)
 PSR-175 (2004, export model)
 PSR-180 (1994)
 PSR-185 (1995)
 PSR-190 (1996)
 PSR-195 / PSR-195PC (1998)
 PSR-200 (1991)
 PSR-201 (2000)
 PSR-202 (2002, export model)
 PSR-210 (1993)
 PSR-215 (1995)
 PSR-220/PSR-220PC (1996)
 PSR-225/PSR-225GM/PSR-225PC (1998/2001/1998)
 PSR-230 (1996)
 PSR-240 (1999)
 PSR-260 
 PSR-262 
 PSR-270 
 PSR-273 
 PSR-275 

 PSR-280 
 PSR-282 
 PSR-290 
 PSR-292 
 PSR-293 
 PSR-295 
 PSR-300 
 PSR-310 / PSR-310M 
 PSR-320 
 PSR-330 
 PSR-340 
 PSR-350 
 PSR-400 
 PSR-403 
 PSR-410 
 PSR-420 
 PSR-450 
 PSR-500 / PSR-500M 
 PSR-510 / PSR-510M 
 PSR-520 
 PSR-530 / PSR-530PC 
 PSR-540 / PSR-540PC 
 PSR-550 
 PSR-600 (1992)
 PSR-620 (1995)
 PSR-630 
 PSR-640 
 PSR-730 
 PSR-740 
 PSR-1000 
 PSR-1100 
 PSR-1700 (1993, export model)
 PSR-2000 
 PSR-2100 
 PSR-2500 / PSR-3500 / PSR-4500 (1989)
 PSR-2700 (1993, export model)
 PSR-4000 (1995)
 PSR-4600 (1990, export model)
 PSR-5700 (1992)
 PSR-6000 (1994, export model)
 PSR-6300 (1986), contains two YM2414 (FM) and YM2154 (rhythm) chips
 PSR-6700 (1991, export model)

PSR-E

 PSR-E203 
 PSR-E213 
 PSR-E223 
 PSR-E233 
 PSR-E243 
 PSR-E253 
 PSR-E263 
 PSR-E273 
 PSR-E303 
 PSR-E313 
 PSR-E323 
 PSR-E333 
 PSR-E343 
 PSR-E353 
 PSR-E363 
 PSR-E373 
 PSR-E403  
 PSR-E413 
 PSR-E423 
 PSR-E433 
 PSR-E443 
 PSR-E453 / PSR-EW400 
 PSR-E463 / PSR-EW410  The EW410 offers 76 keys and features phono jacks for connecting external powered speakers. The E463 has 61 keys.
 PSR-E473 / PSR-EW425  The EW425 offers 76 keys and features phono jacks for connecting external powered speakers. The E473 has 61 keys.
PSR others

 PSR-I400 (2019, with Indian styles)

 PSR-I500 (10 April 2018, with Indian styles)
 PSR-I455 (28 December 2011, with Indian styles)
 PSR-I425 (18 May 2007, with touch response)
 PSR-A3 (1995, with Arabic Scale)
 PSR-D1 / PSRD1-DJX (1998, DJ keyboard)
 PSR-GX76 (2000, export model, with Portable Grand)
 PSR-K1 
 PSR-F51
EOS series (including YS/SDX/TQ)

 EOS YS100 / YS100 (1988, easy operating FM synth, 4op FM/8 muti-timbral)
 EOS YS200 / YS200 / TQ5 (1988, YS100 with 8track sequencer, TQ = desktop module version)
 EOS DS55 (c. 1988)
 EOS B200 / SDX-2000 (1988/1989, SDX = classroom keyboard)
 EOS B500 (1990)
 EOS B700 (1993, minor change of B500)
 EOS B900 / SDX-3000 (1995/1995, floppy disk, SDX = classroom keyboard)
 EOS B900EX (1996, minor change of B900, with blue body and USB)
 EOS B2000 / EOS B2000W (1998, with sequencer similar to QY700, sampling similar to SU10, W = white)
 EOS BX (2001, produced by Daisuke Asakura, based on S03 with USB)

EZ series
PSR-J/EZ series keyboard
 EZ-J14 (2003)
 EZ-J15 (2005)
 EZ20 (2001, export model)
 PSR-J20 / PSR-J20C (1999)
 PSR-J21 (2000)
 EZ-J22 (2001)
 EZ-J23 (2002, silver & pink)
 EZ-J24 (2003)
 EZ-J25 (2005)
 EZ-30 
 EZ-300 (2020)
 PSR-J51 (2000)
 EZ-J53 (2002)
 EZ-150 (2003, export model)
 EZ-200 / EZ-J200 
 EZ-220 
 EZ-J210 (2009)
 EZ-250i

Silent instruments

Electric violins
 YSV-104
 SV-120 (discontinued)
 SV-130 (discontinued)
 SV-150 (discontinued)
 SV-200 (discontinued)
 EV-204 (discontinued)
 EV-205 (discontinued)
 SV-250
 SV-255

Electric violas
SVV-200SK

Electric cellos
SVC-50SK
SVC-100 (discontinued)
SVC-110SK
SVC-200SK
SVC-210SK

Electric upright basses
SLB-100SK
SLB-200SK
SLB-200LTD
SLB300

Guitars

Acoustic guitars
F310

Classical guitars

Concert Classic
 GC-3 (c. 1967)
 GC-5 (c. 1967) Solid cedar top, laminate rosewood back and sides
 GC-7 (c. 1967) Solid cedar top, laminate rosewood back and sides
 GC-10 (c. 1967) Solid cedar top, Solid rosewood back and sides
 gc 60 (c. 1968)
 Concert Classic 80 (c. 1968)
 Concert Classic 100 (c. 1968)
 Concert Classic 120 (c. 1968)
 Concert Classic 150 (c. 1968)
 Flamenco series
 GC-5F (c. 1968)
 GC-7F (c. 1968)
 GC-10F (c. 1968)
Custom Classical guitars
 GC-30A (c. 1974)
 GC-30B (c. 1974)
 GC-30C (c. 1974)
C series
 
 C-30S (c. 1984, small body)
 C40
 C-50S (c. 1984, small body)
 C-170A (c. 1984)
 C-200A (c. 1984)
 C-250A (c. 1984)
 C-300A (c. 1984)
 C-400A (c. 1984)
 C-530 (c. 1988)
Grand Concert Classic
 CG-150 (c. 1968)
 CG-180SA (c. 1966)
CG series
 CG-100A
 CG-101A
 CG-120
 CG-120A
 CG-151
 CG-171SF
GD series
 GD-10[C] (1990)
 GD-20[C] (1990)
 GD-20[E][CE] (1992)

G series

 G50A 1969-72 $69.50
 G-60 1970- $59.00 Two-piece spruce top, maple back and sides, rosewood fingerboard and bridge, length  inches, width  inches
 G60A 1969-73 $79.50
 G65A 1972-74 $95.50
 G70A 1969-72 $--.--
 G-80 1970- (1970 price $69.00) Two-piece spruce top, maple back and sides, rosewood fingerboard and bridge, nineteen nickel silver frets, length  inches, width inches
 G80A 1969-74 $75.00
 G85A 1970-72 $89.50
 G90A 1967-74 $125.50
 G-100 1967-76 (1970 price $79.00) Two-piece spruce top, maple back and sides, rosewood fingerboard and bridge with nineteen nickel silver frets, length  inches, width  inches
 G100A 1970-72 $99.50 
 G-120 1970- (1970 price $89.00) Two-piece spruce top, curly maple back and sides, mahogany neck, rosewood fingerboard and bridge, length  inches, width  inches
 G120A 1970-76 $142.50
 G130A 1969-76 $119.50
 G150A 1970-76 $166.50
 G-160  1970-1977-? (1970 price  $109.00) Two-piece spruce top, rosewood back and sides, mahogany neck, nineteen nickel silver frets, six color wood marquetry around soundhole, length  inches, width  inches, 36-inch scale 
 G280A 1972-74 $300
 G231S 1978-80 Spruce top, laminate mahogany back and sides, rosewood fretboard and bridge, nut width 2 inches - 51 mm
 G-245S 1977-81 $265.00 Solid spruce top,  laminate rosewood back and sides, rosewood fretboard and bridge, Nato neck 658 mm scale 
 G-245Sii 1981-1985 $--.--
 G-250S 1977-1981 $290 Solid spruce top/quarter sawn, real wood marquetry rosette, triple laminated veneer head, Ebony fingerboard, rosewood back and sides, rosewood bridge, transverse fan type bracing, concert scale size of 260mm with a 52mm nut width
 G255S 1977-81 $360.00 Solid spruce top/quarter sawn, real wood marquetry rosette, triple laminated veneer head, Ebony fingerboard, rosewood back and sides, Jacaranda bridge, transverse fan type bracing, concert scale size of 260mm with a 52mm nut width
 G255Sii 1981-85 $375.00 Solid cedar top
 G-260S 1981-85 $xxx.xx Concert guitar laminated back/sides

Steel and nylon string option guitars

 No. 30 (1950s)
 No. 50 (1950s)
 No. 70 (c. 1958)
 No. 1 / No. 1A / No. 1B (c. 1958)
 No. 2 (c. 1958 or 1961)
 No. 4 (1950s/1960s)
 No. 8 (c. 1958)
 No. 10A / No. 10B (before 1963)
 No. 15 (before 1963)
 No. 20 / No. 20A (before 1963/after 1963)
 No. 40 (c. 1958)
 No. 80 (before 1963)
 S-20
 S50 / S-50 (after 1963)
 S70 / S-70 (after 1963)
 No. 25 (c. 1964)
 No. 45 (c. 1964)
 No. 60 (c. 1964)
 No. 85 (c. 1964)
 No.100 (c. 1967)
 No. 120 (c. 1964)
 No. 300 (c. 1964)

Steel-string acoustic guitars
F series
 F-310
 F-315
 F-325
 F-335 TBS
 F-370
 F-D01
 FD01S
 F-D02
FG series
 
 

 FG-75 (c. 1969R2, slightly small (length 40 inches))
 FG-75 1
 FG-110 (c. 1968R, folk)
 FG-120F (1974/1975 size 00 Black Label)
 FG-130 (1972G, folk)
 FG-140 (c. 1969R, '68jumbo)
 FG-150 / FG-150F (c. 1968R/1974B, folk)
 FG-151 / FG-151B (1976/1978, western)
 FG-152 (1976, folk)
 FG-160 (1972G, jumbo)
 FG-170 (1972G, folk)
 FG-180 (c. 1968R, '68jumbo)
 FG-180J (1974B, jumbo)
 FG-200 / FG-200J (1972G/1974B, jumbo)
 FG-200F (1974B, folk)
 FG-200D (1981, yamaha western)
 FG-201 / FG-201B (1976/1978, western)
 FG-202 / FG-202B / FG-202D (1976/1978/1981, folk)
 FG-220 (c. 1969R2, '68jumbo)

 FG-230 (c. 1968R, 12strings '68jumbo)
 FG-240 (1972G, jumbo)
 FG-250 / FG-250F (1972G/1974B, folk)
 FG-250J (1974B, jumbo)
 FG-250D / FG-250M / FG-250S (1981/1984, yamaha western, M = mahogany side & back, S = sunburst)
 FG12-250 (1981, 12strings yamaha western)
 FG-251 / FG-251B (1976/1978, western)
 FG-252 / FG-252B / FG-252D / FG-252C (1976/1978/1981/1984, folk)
 FG-260 (1972G, 12strings jumbo)
 FG-280 (c. 1969R2/1972G, '68jumbo)
 FG-300 (c. 1969R2, '68jumbo)
 FG-300J (1974B, jumbo)
 FG-300N (1974/1975, jumbo, N = jacaranda sides & back)
 FG-300D / FG-300DE (1981, yamaha western, E = 2way piezo electric)
 FG-300S / FG-300M (1981/1984, yamaha western, S = sunburst, M = mahogany side & back)
 FG-12-300 (1974B, 12strings jumbo)
 FG-301 / FG-301B (1976/1978, western)
 FG12-301 / FG12-301B (1976/1980, 12strings western)
 FG-302 / FG-302B / FG-302D / FG-302C (1976/1978/1981/1984, folk)
 FG-303 / FG-303E (1981, semi-jumbo, E = 2way piezo electric)
 FG-310
 FG-325
FG-331
 FG-332
 FG-335
 FG-335 II
 FG-340 (1972G, folk)
 FG-340 II (1981–85, western)
 FG-345 II (1981-1985)
 FG-350 (c. 1969R, '68jumbo)
 FG-350F (1974B, fork)
 FG-350J (1974B, jumbo)
 FG-350E (1972G2, western style jumbo, E = magnetic electric (Gibson J-160E style))
 FG-350D (1981, yamaha western)
 FG12-350 (1981, 12strings yamaha western)
 FG-351 / FG-351B (1976/1978, western)
 FG-360 (1972G, jumbo)

 FG-400
 FG-400J (1974B, jumbo)
 FG-400W (1974B, western style jumbo)
 FG-400D / FG-400S / FG-400M (1981/1981/1984, yamaha western, S = sunburst, M = mahogany side & back)
 FG-401
 FG-401B (1978, western)
 FG-401W / FG-401WB (1976/1980, western, western style)
 FG-402 /FG-402B / FG-402C (1976/1978/1984, folk)
 FG-403 (1981, semi-jumbo)
 FG-410A
 FG-411S
 FG-412 BL
 FG-420
 FG-420A
 FG-420-12A (12 String)
 FG-430
 FG-440 (1972G, folk)
 FG-441
 FG-450 (1972G, jumbo)
 FG-450E (1974B, western style jumbo, E = magnetic electric (J-160E style))
 FG-455
 FG-460-12 (12 string)
 FG-461
 FG-500 (c. 1969R, '68jumbo)
 FG-500F (1974B, folk)
 FG-500J (1974B, jumbo)
 FG-500S (1981, yamaha western, S = sunburst)
 FG-550 (c. 1969R, 12strings '68jumbo)
 FG-580 (1972G2, new jumbo)
 FG-600S (1972G2, folk, western style, S = sunburst)
 FG-600J (1974B, HQ jumbo)
 FG-612S (1981-1985, 12strings)
 FG-630 (1972G2, 12strings new jumbo)
 FG-700 (1972G2, new jumbo)
 FG-700S (1974B, western style jumbo, S = sunburst)

 FG-720S
 FG-720S-12 (12strings)
 FG-730S
 FG-750S
 FG-800J (1974B, HQ jumbo)
 FG-12-800 (1974B, 12strings HQ jumbo)
 FG-850 (1972G2, new jumbo)
 FG-1000 (1972G2, new jumbo)
 FG-1000J (1974B, HQ jumbo)
 FG-1200J (1974B, HQ jumbo)
 FG-1200S / FG-1200SN (1974, western style jumbo (Gibson Dove style), S = sunburst, SN = natural)
 FG-1500 (1972G2, folk)
 FG-2000 (1972G2, new jumbo)
 FG-2500 (1972G2, 12strings new jumbo)
FX series
 FX-170A (1984, yamaha jumbo, limited entry model)
L series
 
 
 
 
 L-5 / L-5S / L-5T (1976/1976/1984)
 L-5A (1978-1984)
 L-5ES / L-5E / L-5SE (1980/1981, yamaha western, ES = piezo electric, E/SE = 2way piezo electric)
 L12-5 / L12-5A (1976/1980, 12strings yamaha western)
 L-6 (1976, yamaha western)
 L12-6 / L12-6E (1981, 12strings yamaha western, E = 2way piezo electric)
 L-7S (1976, yamaha western, western style (Gibson Dove style))
 L-8 / L-8S (1976/1981, yamaha western)
 L12-8 / L12-8A (1976/1980, 12strings yamaha western)
 L-10 / L-10S / L-10T (1976/1976/1984, yamaha western)
 L-10ES / L-10E (1980/1981, yamaha western, ES = piezo electric + sunburst, E = 2way piezo electric + 4way controls (PMS II))
 L-12S / L-12SN (1976, yamaha western, western style (Gibson Dove style), S = sunburst, SN = natural)
 L-15 (1976/1980, yamaha western/yamaha jumbo)
 L-21A (1984, jumbo, A = old finish)
 L-31 / L-31A (1974/1978, HQ jumbo/yamaha jumbo, A = old finish)
 L-41 (1980, yamaha western)
L series custom made
 L12-50 Custom (1980, 12strings yamaha jumbo)
 L-51 (1974, custom I/custom A)
 L-52 / CJ-52 Custom (1974/1980, custom II/custom B/country jumbo (Gibson Everly Brothers style))
 L-53 (1974, custom III/custom C)
 L-53 Custom (1980, yamaha jumbo)
 L-54 (1974, custom IV/custom D, western style (Gibson Dove style))
 L-55 Custom (1980, yamaha jumbo)
LA series
 
 LA-17 (1984)
 LA-27 (1984)
 LA-37 (1984)
 LA12-37 (1984, 12strings)
 LA-47 (1984)
 LA-57 Custom (1984)
LJ series
 LJ6 (China)
 LJ16 (China)
 LJ26 (Japan)
 LJ36 (Japan)
LL series
 LL6, LLX6 (China, X = electric)
 LL16, LLX16, LLX16C (China, X = electric, C = cutaway)
 LL26, LLX26C (Japan, X = electric, C = cutaway)
 LL36, LLX36C (Japan, X = electric, C = cutaway)
LS series
 LS6 (China)
 LS16 (China)
 LS26 (Japan)
 LS36 (Japan)
CJ series

 
 CJ-7 (1978–1983)
 CJ-8XE (1981, Gibson Everly Brothers style, XE = 2way piezo electric)
 CJ-10, CJ-10B (1978–1983, B = brown burst)
 CJ-12 (1993–2007)
 CJ-12P BL (1997–2007)
 CJ-15 / CJ-15B (1978–1983, B = brown burst)
 CJ-22 (1992–2007)
 CJ-32 (1994–2009)
 CJ-52 Custom (1980–1988, Gibson Everly Brothers style)
CP series
 
 CP-300 (1978)
 CP-400 (1978)
 CP-500 (1978)
CWE series
 
 
 
 CWE-8 (c. 1984)
 CWE-18 (1984, PMS V)
 CWE-18C (1984, PMS IV, gut string)
 CWE-28 (1984, PMS IV)
 CWE-58 (1984, PMS IV)
N series
 N500 (1976, yamaha western)
 N700 (1976, yamaha western)
 N1000 (1976, yamaha western)
S series
 
 S-11 / S-11E (1980/1981, yamaha semi-jumbo, E = 2way piezo electric)
 S-21 (1980, yamaha semi-jumbo)
 S-51 Custom (1980, yamaha semi-jumbo)
SJ series
 SJ-180 (1981-1985, yamaha semi-jumbo)
XS series
 
 XS-16Black (1982, semi-jumbo)
 XS-26E Black (1982, semi-jumbo, E = 2way piezo electric + 4way controls)
 XS-56E Black (1982, semi-jumbo, E = 2way piezo electric + 4way controls (PMS II))

Guitalele

 GL-1
 JR1

Silent guitars
 SLG-100N
 SLG-100S
 SLG-110N
 SLG-110S
 SLG-130NW
 SLG-200S
 SLG-200N
 SLG-200NW

Electric-acoustic guitars
 5A
 APX series
 CPX series
 FAX
 FGX/FJX
 FX
 LX
 NTX

Electric guitars

AE series
 full hollow body, single cutaway

 AE-11 (1967)
 AE-12 (1972)
 AE-18 (1972)
 AE-500

 AE-1200 (1978)
 AE-1200S2 (1989)
 AE-1200T (1979)
 AE-1500 (1991)
 AE-2000 (1978)

 AEX500N2 (1998)
 AEX1500 (c. 1994)

AES series
 thinline hollow body, single cutaway

 AES-500
 AES620 Sammy Hagar signature
 AES-620
 AES-620HB
 AES-720
 AES-820 (2002)

 AES1500
 AES1500B

CV series
 CV820WB Wes Borland signature
EG series

 EG-012

 EG-112

 EG-303

ERG series
 ERG-121
EX series
 
 EX-1 / EX-2 (1985)
GX series
 
 GX1 (1986)

Pacifica

 PAC012
 PAC112J
 PAC112JL
 PAC112V
 PAC302S

 PAC412V
 PAC612V
 PAC812V
 PAC904
 PAC1221M
 PAC1511MS Mike Stern signature

RGX series

 
 RGX110
 RGX120D
 RGX121z
 RGX211
 RGX312
 RGX420DZ
 RGX421D
 RGX512J
 RGX721D
 RGXA2
RGZ series
 RGZ321P
SA series
 thinline hollow body, double cutaway

 SA-5 / SA-5B (1966)
 SA-20 / SA-20B (1968, 12strings,
 B = pearl color)
 SA-30 / SA-30T (c. 1968, export model?)
 SA-50 / SA-50B (1967, tremolo,
 B = pearl or sycamore)
 SA-60 (1973)
 SA-90 (1973)
 SA-500 (2005, Art Deco f-holes)
 SA-503 TVL Troy Van Leeuwen signature
 SA-700 (1977)
 SA-900 (1983)

 SA-1000 (1977)
 SA-1100 (1988)
 SA-1200S (1972)
 SA-1300 (1983)
 SA-1800 / SA-1800L (1983, L = left hand)
 SA-2000 / SA-2000S (1977/1979)
 SA-2100II (1988)
 SA2200
 SA-2500 (1983)
 SAS-I / SAS-II / SAS-III (1988, small body)
 SAS-1500

SA series (Rickenbacker type)
 
 SA-15 / SA-15D (1968)
 SA-RR Custom (1989, with Telecaster bridge)
SC series

 SC-700 (1977)
 SC-800 (1977)
 SC-1000 (1977)
 SC-1200 (1977)

 SC-3000 (1980, SF shape)
 SC-5000 (1980, SF shape)
 SC-7000 (1980, SF shape)

SE series

 SE-110
 SE-150
 SE-200
 SE-203
 SE-211
 SE-250
 SE-300 / SE-300H
 SE-350 / SE-350H

 SE-603M
 SE-612 / SE-612A
 SE-700HE (1985)
 SE-700M
 SE-903A
 SE-1203 / SE-1203a
 SE-1212 / SE-1212a
 SE-1220 / SE-1220a

Session series
 Session 503 (1985)
 Session 512 (1985)
 Session 520 (1985)
SF series

 SF-400
 SF-500 (1980)
 SF550
 SF-600
 SF-700 (1977)
 SF-1000 (1977)

 SF-3000 (1980)
 SF-5000 (1980)
 SF-7000 (1980)

 SFX-I (1985)
 SFX-II (1985)
 SFX-III (1985)

SG series (earlier)
earlier SG series
 SG-2 (1966, asymmetrical double cutaway 1)
 SG-3 (1966, asymmetrical double cutaway 2)
1966-67 SG reverse cutaway

 SG-5 (1966)
 SG-7 (1966)

 SG-2A (1967)
 SG-5A (1967)
 SG-7A (1967)
 SG-12A (1967)

 SG-7AS (1996)
 SG-12AS (1996)

 BJ PRO (2000)
 BJ PRO 12 (2002)

1968 SG non-reverse cutaway
 SG-2C (1968)
 SG-3C (1968)
1972 SG single cutaway

 SG-40
 SG-60 / SG-60T (c. 1973, German carved, T = tremolo)
 SG-80 (German carved, tone selector)

 SG-45
 SG-65
 SG-85

SGV series
Asymmetrical double cutaway guitar based on earlier SG-2, 5/5A, 7/7A [see above], manufactured in early 2000s
 SGV-300
 SGV-500
 SGV-700 (Japan only)
 SGV-800 (2000)
 SGV-1200 (Japan only)(2001)
 SGV Blue Jeans (Japan only)

SG series (stable)
1973-74 SG series (with different pickguard shape)

 SG-30 (1973, Katsura-wood, bolt-on neck, dot inlays)
 SG-35 (1973, Natoh mahogany, bolt-on neck, parallelogram inlays)

 SG-30A (1974, maple body SG-30)
 SG-35A (1974, maple body SG-35)
 SG-50 (1974, set-in neck, dot inlays, large pickguard)
 SG-70 (1974, mahogany body SG-50)
 SG-90 (1974, mahogany carved-top with top binding, set-in neck)

stable SG series (SG-2000 shape)

 SG-175 (1974, 1st model with current SG style)
 SG-175B (1996, Yamaha Electric Guitars 30th Anniversary, with Buddha inlay replicated from Carlos Santana model)
 SG-25S / SG-25T (1991 by Yamaha custom shop, Yamaha Electric Guitars 25th Anniversary, based on SG-3000, S = pearl inlay on the body (hummingbird and floral), T = Takanaka model (tremolo and HSH pickups))
 SG-200 (1978) Yuri Kasparyan
 SG-300
 SG-400 (1976)
 SG-500 / SG-500B (July 1976/?)
 SG-510 (1983)
 SG-600 (1979)
 SG-700 (July 1976)
 SG-710T (1984, tremolo)
 SG-800 (1977)
 SG-800S / SBG-500 (1981/1981 (or 1982), limited 6 colors)
 SG1000 / SG-1000L / SBG-1000 (July 1976–1984/1977/1976–1983 in the US, set-in neck, L = left hand)
 SG-1000N / SG1000-24 (1983, 24 = 24frets)
 SG-1000NW (1984)
 SG-1000S (1976)
 SG-1000X (1981)
 SG-1000XU
 SG-1000XY (1985)
 SG-1300 / SG-1300-24 / SG-1300T (1983, 24 = 24frets, T = tremolo)
 SG-1300TS (1984, tremolo)
 SG-1500 (July 1976–1978(or 1979) in the US, basically same as SG-2000, with dot inlay and chrome hardware)
 SG-1500 (1981 in Japan, different new model)
 SG-1600 (1983)
 SG1802 (2010, Seymour Duncan P-90-3 pickups)
 SG1820 / SG1820A (2010, A = EMG85/81 pickups)
 SG-1966 (1985, Yamaha Shibuya Store 20th Anniversary)
 SG-1996
 SG2000 / SBG-2000 / SG-2000S (July 1976–1988/1980s in US/1980s in UK, carved 3 piece maple top/contoured back, 3 piece neck-through (mahogany/maple/mahogany), brass block under the bridge (for sustain))
 SG2000 Devadip (1976, Devadip Carlos Santana model, with Tennyo inlay, dark green)
 SG-2000MT Masayoshi Takanaka model (1998)
 SG2004 (2003)
 SG2100 / SBG-2100 / SG2100S (1983/1984 in the US/UK)
 SG-2500 (1983 in Japan)
 SG3000 / SBG-3000 (1982/1982 in the US, neck-through)
 SG3000 Custom / SBG-3000 Custom (1982/1982 in the US or c. 1985, neck-through, Mexican abalone purfling to the top)

custome shop SG
 SG-I Issei Noro signature (rounded horns)
 SG-T / SG-T2 Masayoshi Takanaka model (1988 (or 1989)/1998, based on SG-3000, with alphabet graphics, tremolo and HSH pickups)
 SG-RR Custom (1989)
 SG-RR Standard (1989, P-90 type pickups, similar to Les Paul Junior DC / Les Paul Special DC)
 SG-RR Junior (1990, P-90 type pickups & Bolt-on neck)
 MSG (1989, rounded horns)
 TSG (1985, Yamaha Electric Guitars 20th Anniversary, asymmetrical rounded horns)
 YSG (1989, asymmetrical double cutaway)

SBG series
 renamed SG in the US, 1980s / renewaled SG in Japan, 1998 / reissued SG in the US, ca.2009
 SBG500(1981 (or 1982)-1983 in the US, export version of SG-800S)
 SBG500B
 SBG700 (1978 or 1979 in the US, renamed version of SG-700)
 SBG700S (1999)
 SBG800S (1998)
 SBG1000 (1980s-1983 in the US/1998/c. 2009 30th anniversary handcraft model, renamed version of SG-1000)
 SBG1200 (1998)
 SBG1996
 SBG2000 (1980s-1984/1998/c. 2009, renamed version of SG-2000, later reissued as 30th anniversary handcraft model)
 SBG2100 (1984 or 1985, successor of SBG2000 in the US)
 SBG3000 (1982/1998/2009, later reissued as 40th anniversary of Yamaha distribution in the U.S, Limited handcraft edition, only 40 pieces made)

SJ series
 
 SJ-500 (1978)
 SJ-800 (1978)

SX series
 

 SX-60
 SX-80
 SX-125
 SX-800A
 SX-800B
 SX-900A
 SX-900B

VX series
 
 VX-1 / VX-2 (1985)

Bass guitars

 ATTITUDE Limited II Billy Sheehan signature
BB bass

 

 BB-424 / BB-424X (2010/2011)
 BB-425 / BB-425X (2010/2011) 5-string version of 424
 BB-714BS (2008) Billy Sheehan signature
 BB-1024 / BB-1024X (2010/2011)
 BB-1025 / BB-1025X (2010/2011) 5-string version of 1024, based on BB-2000
 BB-2024 / BB-2024X (2009/?)
 BB-2025 / BB-2025X (2010/?) 5-string version of 2024
 BB-NE2 Nathan East signature
 BB-P34 / BB-P35
 archived
 BB-201
 BB-350[F] / BB-350L†
 BB-400 Series† passive electronics series
 BB-404[F] (2002)†
 BB-405 (2002)† Nathan East style 5-string
 BB-414 / BB-414X (2005)†
 BB-415 (c. 2005 ?)† 5-string
 BB-550
 BB-600 Series† active electronics series
 BB-604 (2002)† Nathan East style 4-string, with NE1 parametric EQ and BB-NE2 silhouette
 BB-605 (2002)†  Nathan East style 5-string, with NE1 parametric EQ and BB-NE2 silhouette
 BB-614 (2005)† 4-string
 BB-615 (2005)† 5-string
 BB-650
 BB-800
 BB-850

 BB-1000
 BB1000MA (2002)† Michael Anthony style
 BB-1200
 BB-1500A† vintage-style
 BB-1600
 BB-2000
 BB-2000F / BB-2000S
 BB-2004 (2002)† Nathan East style 4-string
 BB-2004 / BB-2004 Black/Natural Satin/White† 4-string based on BB-NE2
 BB-2005 (2002)† Nathan East style 5-string
 BB-2005 / BB-2005 Black/Natural Satin/White† 5-string based on BB-NE2
 BB-2024SK (2012) Seiji Kameda signature
 BB-3000 / BB-3000S (1982)†
 BB-3000MA† Michael Anthony signature
 BB-5000

 archived artist models
 BB-EAST† Nathan East signature 5-string
 BB-G4 / BB-G4S / BB-G4A† 4-string
 BB-G5 / BB-G5S / BB-G5A† 5-string version of BB-G4
 BB-N4[F]†
 BB-N5 / BB-N5A†
 BB-NE / BB-NES  Nathan East signature
 BB-VI / BB-VIS
 BB-VII

BEX bass
 BEX-BS Billy Sheehan signature (2002, single cataway semi-acoustic bass, with Art Deco f-hole)
BX bass
 
 BX-1 (1985)
 BX-5
ERB bass
 ERB 070 BP
 ERB 300 2
EBX bass
 
 EBX-1 (1985)

Motion bass
 MB-I (1985)
 MB-II (1985)
 MB-III (1985)
RBX bass

 RBX-A2
 RBX-JM2
 RBX-4A2M
 RBX-5
 RBX-5F
 RBX-5A2
 RBX-40
 RBX-6JM / RBX-6JM2 John Myung signature
 RBX-170
 RBX-200
 RBX-250
 RBX-250F
 RBX-260
 RBX-270

 RBX-300
 RBX-350
 RBX-350II
 RBX-370-A
 RBX-374
 RBX-375
 RBX-460
 RBX-550
 RBX-550M
 RBX-750A
 RBX-755A
 RBX-765A
 RBX-600
 RBX-600M
 RBX-800
 RBX-800AF
 RBX-1000

SA bass
 
 SA-17 (1967)
 SA-70 / SA-70B (1968, B = pearl color)
 SA-75 (1973)
SB bass

 SB-1C
 SB-2
 SB-2A
 SB-5A
 SB-7A
 SB-30
 SB-50
 SB-55
 SB-70
 SB-75

 SB-500
 SB-500S
 SB-600
 SB-700
 SB-800
 SB-800S
 SB-1200S

SBV bass
 
 SBV-J1 / SBV-J2 (2004, Hajime Okano produced, J1 = J type pickups / J2 = P type pickups)
TRB bass

 TRB-1004
 TRB-1005 / TRB-1005F
 TRB-1006
 TRB4
 TRB5
 TRB6
 TRB4II
 TRB5II
 TRB6II
 TRB-5P
 TRB-6P
 TRB-5PII
 TRB-6PII
 TRB-6JP / TRB-6JP2 John Patitucci signature

Guitar effects

 Magicstomp Model UB99
01 series Professional System Effectors (1980)

 AD-10 Analog Delay
 CH-01 Chorus
 CO-01 Compressor
 DS-01 Distortion
 FL-01 Flanger
 LI-01 Limiter
 LS-01 Line Selector
 MP-01 Mini Pedal (with CV output)

 NG-01 Noise Gate
 OC-01 Octaver
 PE-01 Parametric EQ
 PH-01 Phaser
 TB-01 Tone Booster
 SB-100 Professional System Board
 SB-200 Professional System Board (with patch panel)

10M series
 OD-10M Over Drive
10M II series
 CO-10MII Compressor
20M series
 DDS-20M Delay Pedal
 DSC-20M Stereo Chorus Pedal
 MDB-20M Multi-band Distortion Pedal
100 series (c. 1988)

 BD-100 Beat Drive
 CO-100 Compressor
 COD-100 C MOS Over Drive
 CS-100 Compressor Sustainer
 DD-100 Digital Delay
 DI-100 Distortion

 FL-100 Flanger
 GE-100 Graphic Equalizer for Guitar
 NR-100 Noise Reducer
 PH-100 Phase Shifter
 AC-320 Power Supply

x01 series Professional System Effectors

 PSE40A system board
 COY-101 Compressor
 ODY-101 Over Drive
 GEY-201 Graphic EQ
 ADY-301 Analog Delay

 CHY-301 Chorus
 FLY-401 Flanger
 PHY-401 Phaser
 VP-500 volume pedal

Guitar amplifiers
HY-10G / HY-10GIII (40 W?)
Park G10 (combo, designed by Marshall)
T50 / T50C (c. 2009, 50 W tube head/combo, designed by Soldano (SLO))
T100 / T100C (c. 2009, 100 W tube head/combo, designed by Soldano (SLO))
A line
AA5 (battery amp, 5 W, for silent guitar)
BA-15 (bass amp)
GA-10 (7 W 12cm)
GA-15
VA-5 "Power Boy" (5 W 12cm)
VA-7W
VA-10 (twin 3 W+3 W 2×12cm))
R line 
AR-1500 (15 W 8-inch introduced 1990)
AR-1500 Live / AR-1500R (15 W 8-inch, R = reverb. introduced 1992)
AR-1500B (15 W 10-inch bass amp introduced 1990)
AR-2500 (25 W 10-inch introduced 1990)
AR-2500B (25 W 12-inch bass amp introduced 1990)
AR-PRO (30 W 10-inch combo)
HR-1000
HR-1000B (bass amp)
HR-1500 (c. 1987, 25 W?)
HR-1500B (bass amp)
HR-2000
HR-2000B (bass amp)
HR-3000B (bass amp)
SR50-112 (50 W 12-inch introduced 1994)
SR100-112 (100 W 12-inch introduced 1994)
SR100-212 (100 W 2×12-inch introduced 1994)
SR300G (300 W 4ohm head)
SR412 (4×12-inch cabinet)
SR400B (400 W bass head)
SR215B (2×15-inch bass cabinet)
SR80B-115 (80 W 15-inch bass amp)
SR160B-115 (160 W 15-inch bass amp)
VR4000 (stereo 50 W 2×10-inch)
VR6000 (stereo 100 W 2×12-inch)
DG series
 
DG60-112 / DG60FX-112 / DS60-112 (12-inch, combo / combo with effects / powered cabinet)
DG80-112A
DG85
DG100-212 / DG100-212A (2×12-inch, A = with built-in effects (chorus, tremolo, tape echo))
DG-1000 (preamp, flagship of DG amp series & DG-STOMP series)
DS60-112 (12-inch, combo / powered cabinet; similar power circuitry and same Celestion speaker as the DG60-112, but not digital; three band High Mid base EQ, no effects)
F series (Introduced 1980)

F-20 (20 W 8-inch introduced 2001)
F-20FX (FX = stereo effects)
F-20B (20 W 10-inch bass amp introduced 2001)
F30R (30 W 10-inch, R = reverb.)
F50-112 (50 W 12-inch, color:black, gray 1980)
F50-115B (50 W bass amp, 50 W 15-inch 1980)
F100-112 (100 W 12-inch, color:black, gray 1980)
F100-115 (100 W 15-inch 1980)
F100-115B (100 W bass amp 15-inch 1980)
F100-212 (100 W 2×12-inch 1980)
G series (1980s)
Series I
Series II 1982
Series III 1985
G-5 (7 W 6-inch introduced 1982)
G-10L (7 W 6-inch introduced 1979)
G-10W (7 W 6-inch introduced 1979)
G50-112 (50 W, 12-inch)
G50-410 (50 W, 4×10-inch)
G100 (100 W head, successor to the J-100)
G100-112 (100 W, 12-inch)
G100-115 (100 W, 15-inch)
G100-210 (100 W, 2×10-inch)
G100-212 (100 W, 2×12-inch)
S412 (4×12-inch cabinet to match G100)
J series (1970s, the combos were replaced by the JX and F series in 1980, the separate heads and cabinets continued into the 1980s)
J-15 (15 W 12-inch introduced 1979)
J-25 (30 W 10-inch)
J-35 (40 W 12-inch)
J-35B (30 W bass amp 15-inch introduced 1979)
J-45II (50 W 12-inch)
J-45B (50 W bass amp 15-inch)
J-55 (50 W 12-inch)
J-55B (50 W bass amp 15-inch)
J-65 (50 W 2×12-inch)
J-75 (50 W 4×10-inch)
J-85 (100 W 2×12-inch)
J-95 (twin)
J-100 (100 W head)
J-100B (100 W bass head)
J-100S (2×12-inch cabinet)
J-105 (100 W 2 Channel amp 2×12-inch)
J-110S (15-inch cabinet)
J-110L (15-inch bass cabinet
J-115 (100 W 15-inch)
J-115B (100 W bass amp 15-inch)
S-115 (bass cabinet for J-115B, 120 W 15-inch)
J-120L (2×15-inch bass cabinet)
J-125 (100 W 2 Channel 15-inch)
J-135 (100 W 4×10-inch)
J-140S (4×12-inch cabinet)
J-145 (100 W 4×12-inch)
J-160S (6×10-inch cabinet)
JX series (1980s)

JX15
JX20 (20 W 10-inch 1980)
JX25 / JX25B
JX30 (30 W 12-inch 1980)
JX30B (30 W bass amp 15-inch 1980)
JX35B (JX30B with comp)
JX40 (30 W 12-inch 1980)
JX50 (50 W 1980)
JX50B (50 W bass amp 1980)
JX55 / JX55B
JX65D (c. 1982, 2×12-inch)

RA rotary speakers (1970s)
 rotary sound amplifiers which produce Leslie speaker effects by rotating a series of speaker units instead of horns. also featuring Yamaha Natural Sound Speaker units
CSY-2 (1975)
R-60 (a combination of dual 3way normal speakers and dual 2way rotary speakers)
RA-50 (1970s, single rotary + woofer)
RA-70R
RA-100 (1970s, dual rotary + woofer)
RA-200R (1970s, triple rotary + woofer) — David Gilmour (Pink Floyd) used it along with Hiwatt amp between 1976 and 1983.
TA series (late 1960s)
 wedge-shaped flat amplifiers, featuring Yamaha Natural Sound Speaker units
TA-20
TA-30 (c. 1968, 30 W RMS/ 50 W music power)
TA-60 (c. 1968, 60 W RMS/100 W music power)
TA-90 (PE100 head + TS90 cabinet, 90 W RMS)
VR series (1989–1991) 
VR-3000 (50 W @ 8Ω, 1x12" speaker, dual channel, 1 parametric EQ per channel, reverb)
VR-4000 (stereo 2×25 W @ 8Ω, 2x10" speakers, dual channel, 1 parametric EQ per channel, reverb, chorus)
VR-5000 (100 W @ 8Ω, 1x12" speaker, dual channel, 2 parametric EQ per channel, reverb)
VR-6000 (stereo 2×50 W @ 8Ω, 2x12" speakers, dual channel, 2 parametric EQ per channel, reverb, chorus)
VR-75B (75 W 15-inch bass amp)
VR-150B (150 W 15-inch bass amp)
VX series (red logo)
VX10 (10 W combo)
VX15 (10 W combo)
VX25 (20 W combo)
VX35 (30 W combo)
VX25B (30 W combo bass amp)
VX35B (30 W combo bass amp)
VX55B (50 W combo bass amp)
YTA series (1970s, blue line)
YTA-15A
YTA-95 (100 W 2×12-inch)
YTA-110A
B series bass amps

Series I
Series II 1982
Series III 1985
B50-115 (50 W bass combo)
B100 (100 W head, successor to the J-100B)
B100-115 I/II/III (100 W bass combo, 15-inch)
B100-115SE (100 W bass combo, 15-inch smaller and lighter than the numbered series, 790mm tall and 44kg, vs 950mm and 52kg)
S115 (15-inch bass cabinet to match B100 head)
S215 (2×15-inch bass cabinet to match B100 head)
BBT series digital bass amps
 BBT500H (head, 500 W@2Ω)
 BBT210S (cabinet, 2×10-inch)
 BBT410S (cabinet, 4×10-inch)
 BBT500-115 (combo, 500 W 15-inch)
YBA series (1970s, blue line)
YBA-45

Power amplifiers
P/PC series power amplifiers
P2500S
P7000S
PC-1002

Keyboard amplifiers
MS101 / MS101-3 (powered monitor, 10 W 4-inch)
SKS50

Percussion instruments

Timpani
All of the Timpani Models (except 9000) are balanced action.
 TP-3100 (Portable Aluminum Series)
 TP-4200 (Concert Series. Fiberglass)
 TP-6200 (Symphonic Series: Smooth Copper)
 TP-7200 (Hammered Symphonic. 4 mm Suspension Ring for Accurate Tuning)
 TP-9000 (Grand Concert Series: Hammered Copper, Ringer Style. Berlin & Dresden Friction Post, and Berlin Ratchet. Comes with a fine tuner.)

Marimbas

 YM-40 (3 1/2 octave Standard Padauk marimba)
 YM-1430 (4 1/3 octave Standard Padauk Marimba)
 YM-2400 (4 1/3 octave intermediate Acoustalon marimba)
 YMRD-2400 (4 1/3 octave Acoustalon Multi-Frame II marimba)
 YMT-2400 (4 1/3 octave Acoustalon Tough-Terrain Frame marimba)
 YMRD-2900A (4 1/2 octave intermediate Acoustalon Multi-Frame II Marimba)
 YM-4600A (4 1/3 octave Professional rosewood Marimba)
 YM-4900A (4 1/2 octave Professional rosewood Marimba)
 YM-5100A (5 Octave Professional rosewood Marimba)
 YM-5104A (5 1/2 octave Custom rosewood Marimba)
 YM-6100 (5 octave Artist(Keiko Abe) Model rosewood Marimba)

Drum kits

Acoustic drums
 Yamaha PHX
 Yamaha Maple Custom Absolute
 Yamaha Birch Custom Absolute
 Yamaha Recording Custom
 Yamaha Rock Tour Custom
 Yamaha Oak Custom
 Yamaha Beech Custom
 Yamaha Tour Custom
 Yamaha Stage Custom
 Yamaha Rock Tour
 Yamaha GigMaker
 Yamaha HipGig

Electronic drums

 EPS-1 (1986) PMC1 "Percussion Midi Converter", Pads: PTT1 (toms, snare), and PTB1 (kick). Included DX7 compatible drum Rom cartridge 
 EPS-D8 (1986) PTX8 "Percussion Tone Generator",  Pads: PTT8 (tom), PSD8 (snare), and PBD8 (kick)
 EP 75 pad (1993)
 KP 75 kick (1993)

 DTX 
 DTXpress 
 DTXpress II / DTXtreme II
 DTXpress III / DTXtreme III 
 DTXpress IV 
 DTXplorer
 DTX-MULTI 12 
 DTX522K / DTX532K / DTX562K 
 DTX500K / DTX900K 
 DTX550K / DTX950K 

DD series digital percussion
 DD-3 
 DD-5 
 DD-6 / DD-7 
 DD-10 
 DD-9/DD-9M 
 DD-11/DD-12/DD-14 
 DD-20/DD-20S/DD-20C 
 DD-35 
 DD-45 / YDD-40 
 DD-50 
 DD-55 / DD-55C 
 DD-65 
 DD-75

Brass instruments

Cornets
 YCR-231
 YCR-233
 YCR-2310II
 YCR-2330II
 YCR-2335
 YCR-6330S
 YCR-8335
 YCR-8620S
 YCR-9435

Trumpets

 YTR-1310
 YTR-1320se
 YTR-1335
 YTR-232
 YTR-2320
 YTR-2320S
 YTR-2330
 YTR-2335
 YTR-4335G
 YTR-6335
 YTR-6345G
 YTR-6345HG II
 YTR-6310Z
 YTR-8310Z
 YTR-8335
 YTR-8335RGS
 YTR-8345
 YTR-9335CHS/NYS
 YTR-9445CHS/NYS
 YTR-9636
 YTR-9835
 YTR-988

Trombones

Student Range
 YSL-154
 YSL-352 (Dis.)
 YBL-322 (Dis.)
 YSL-354
 YSL-354G
Compact Trombones
 YSL-350C
Valve Trombones
 YSL-354V
Intermediate Trombones
 YSL-445G
 YSL-446G
 YSL-447G
 YSL-448G
 YBL-421G
Professional Trombones
 YSL-610
 YSL-620
 YSL-630
 YSL-640
 YBL-620G
Custom Jazz Trombones
 YSL-691Z (Dis.)
 YSL-697Z (Dis.)
 YSL-891Z
 YSL-897Z
Xeno Trombones
 YSL-881
 YSL-881G
 YSL-882
 YSL-882G
 YSL-882O
 YSL-882GO
 YSL-882OR
 YSL-882GOR
 YBL-822G
 YBL-830
Custom Alto Trombones
 YSL-871
 YSL-872

French horns

 YHR-567
 YHR-601
 YHR-667
 YHR-667V
 YHR-668
 YHR-668II

Euphoniums
 YEP-201[S]
 YEP-321[S]
 YEP-621[S]
 YEP-642[S]
 YEP-842[S]

Baritone horns
 YBH-301S
 YBH-621S
 YBH-301M (Marching Baritone)

Tenor horns
 YAH-201
 YAH-203
 YAH-602

Flugelhorns
 YFH-231
 YFH-2310
 YFH-631
 YFH-731
 YFH-631G
 YFH-6310Z
 YFH-731 ( Dis.)
 YFH-8310Z
 YFH-8310G

Tubas
in BBb
 YBB-103 ( Dis. )
 YBB-321
 YBB-621
 YBB-631S
 YBB-641
 YBB-841
 YBB-105MSWC (3/4 Convertible Tuba)
 YBB-201MSWC (Convertible Tuba)
 YBB-202MWC (Marching Tuba)
in CC
 YCB-621
 YCB-661
 YCB-822
 YCB-826S
in Eb
 YEB-321S
 YEB-632S
in F
 YFB-621
 YFB-821
 YFB-822

Sousaphones
in BBb
 YSH-301
 YSH-411

Woodwind instruments

Clarinets

B♭ Clarinets
 Advantage
 YCL-20
 YCL-250 
 YCL-250S (Silver Plated)
 YCL-251 (Japan import)
 YCL-255
 YCL-26
 YCL-26ii (precursor to YCL-250)
 YCL-34
 YCL-34ii (precursor to YCL-450)
 YCL-34iiS (Silver Plated)
 YCL-450 (Silver Plated)
 YCL-450N (Nickel Plated)
 YCL-550AL
 YCL-62
 YCL-64 (precursor to YCL-650)
 YCL-650
 YCL-SE (custom clarinets starting from this point)
 YCL-CS
 YCL-CX
 YCL-SEV
 YCL-CSV
 YCL-CSG
 YCL-CSG-H
 YCL-CSGII

A Clarinets
 YCL-CS-A
 YCL-SE-A
 YCL-CSG-A
 YCL-CSG-AH
 YCL-CSV-A
 YCL-SEV-A
 YCL-CSG-AII

E♭ Clarinets
 YCL-881
 YCL-681II

Bass Clarinets
 YCL-221II
 YCL-621II
 YCL-622II

Alto Clarinets
 YCL-631II

Bassoons
 YFG-811
 YFG-812
 YFG-821

Flutes

 YFL-A421/B
 YFL-B441
 YFL-221
 YFL-261
 YFL-281
 YFL-321
 YFL-361
 YFL 371 (open hole)
 YFL-381
 YFL-421
 YFL-461
 YFL-471
 YFL-481
 YFL-574H
 YFL-574HCT
 YFL-584H
 YFL-584HCT
 YFL-674H
 YFL-674HCT
 YFL-684H
 YFL-684HCT
 YFL-774H
 YFL-774HCT
 YFL-784H
 YFL-784HCT
 YFL-874H
 YFL-874HW
 YFL-881H
 YFL-884H
 YFL-892H
 YFL-894H
 YFL-894HW
 YFL-265s

Piccolos

 YPC-30
 YPC-31
 YPC-32
 YPC-61
 YPC-62
 YPC-81
 YPC-82
 YPC-87R
 YPC-91
 YPC-92

Venova
 YVS-100

Saxophones

Soprano saxophones
 YSS-475II (intermediate grade instrument. Sold mainly in Europe)
 YSS-61 (Yamaha's first professional-grade soprano saxophone)
 YSS-62 (significantly updated version of YSS-61. Professional-grade instrument)
 YSS-675 (Custom model)
 YSS-875 (Custom model)
 YSS-875EX (Custom model)
 YSS-82Z(R) (One-piece custom model)

Alto saxophones

 YAS-21 (Yamaha's first student-grade alto sax)
 YAS 22 (same as 21 body and key work, more copper look lacquer)
 YAS-23 (student-grade instrument which replaced the YAS-21)
 YAS-25 (identical to YAS-23, but has a high F♯ key and improved octave-key mechanism)
 AS-100 (identical to YAS-23. Sold outside Europe & N.America)
 YAS-275 (successor to the YAS-25. Made in Indonesia. Sold mainly in Europe)
 YAS-280 (successor to the YAS-275)
 YAS-31
 YAS-32 (intermediate grade instrument, similar to YAS-52. Superseded by the YAS-475)
 YAS-475 (intermediate grade instrument. Sold mainly in Europe)
YAS-480 (intermediate grade instrument)
 YAS-52 (intermediate grade instrument. Sold mainly in the USA)
 YAS-61 (Yamaha's first professional-grade alto with purple logo. Has non-ribbed construction and real mother of pearl key-touches)
 YAS-62 (Mk 1 version of YAS-62 with purple logo, ribbed construction and real MOP key-touches)
 YAS-62II (Mk 2 version with different neck design, slightly different key-work and key-touches are made from plastic)
 YAS-62III (Mk 3 version with new style neck design, integrated key posts and other changes)
 YAS-82Z (Custom model)
 YAS-82ZII (Custom model)
 YAS-855 (Custom model)
 YAS-875 (Custom model)
 YAS-875EX (Custom model)
 YAS-875EXW (Custom model)

Tenor saxophones

 YTS-21 (Yamaha's first student-grade tenor sax) (Gold and silver color lacquer)
 YTS 22 (almost exact replica of YTS 21 but with pinkish color lacquer)
 YTS-23 (student-grade instrument which replaced the YTS-21)
 YTS-25 (identical to YTS-23, but has a high F♯ key and improved octave-key mechanism)
 TS-100 (identical to YTS-23. Sold outside Europe & N.America)
 YTS-31 (YTS 61 body and keys but no engraving or pearls on F♯s)
 YTS-32 (intermediate grade instrument, similar to YTS-52. Superseded by the YTS-475)
 YTS-52 (intermediate grade instrument. Sold mainly in the USA)
 YTS-275 (successor to the YTS-25. Made in Indonesia)
 YTS-280 (successor to the YTS-275)
 YTS-475 (intermediate grade instrument. Sold mainly in Europe)
 YTS-480
 YTS-61 (Yamaha's first professional-grade tenor sax)
 YTS-62 (Mk 1 version of YTS-62 with purple logo and real mother of pearl key-touches)
 YTS-62II (Mk 2 version with different neck design and key-touches are made from plastic)
YTS-62III (Mk 3 version with different neck design)
 YTS-82Z (Custom model)
 YTS-855 (Custom model)
 YTS-875 (Custom model)
 YTS-875EX (Custom model)

Baritone saxophones
 YBS-32 (intermediate grade instrument)
 YBS-52
 YBS-61 (Yamaha's first professional-grade baritone sax)
 YBS-62
 YBS-62II
 YBS-82

Audio

Music production

Recorders

Digital mixing studio
 n12 / n8 (2007)
 MW8CX / MW10C / MW12C / MW12CX (2007)
 MW10 / MW12 (2006)
 01X (2003)
 DSP Factory DS2416 (digital mixing card (PCI) for PC/Mac, based on 02R)

Audio workstations

 AW1600 (2005, 24bit/16tr(8rec)/36in mixer)
 AW2400 (2005, 24bit/24tr(12rec)/48in mixer)
 AW16G (2002, 24bit/16tr(8rec)/36ch mixer)
 AW2816 (2001, 24bit/16tr/28ch mixer)
 AW4416 (2000, 24bit/16tr/44ch mixer)
 D24 (1998, 24bit/8tr rackmount)

Multitrack recorders
 multitrack recorders for music creation

 DRU8 (1990, 8tr/original 8mm dat)
MD series (MiniDisc)

 MD4 / MD4S (1996/1999)
 MD8 (1998)
CMX series (Compact Cassette)
 CMX1 (1985)
 CMX3 (1988)
 CMX100 / CMX100II / CMX100III (1988/1989/1991)
MT series (Compact Cassette)

 MT1X (1998)
MT2X (1998-1999)
 MT4X (1999) (correct year, was 1994)
 MT8X (1999)
MT8X II (2000)
 MT44 / MT44D (1982/1984)
 MT50 (1994)
 MT-100 (1988)
 MT120 / MT120S (1991)
 MT400 (1999)

Pocket recorders
 
 Pocketrak CX / C24 / W24 (2008/2010)

Audio interfaces
 AG03 / AG06 (2015, USB)
 AUDIOGRAM3 / AUDIOGRAM6 (2008, USB)
 CBX-D3 (1995, 4tr/2rec, SCSI)
 CBX-D5 (1993)
 GO44 / GO46 (FireWire)
 SW1000XG (1998, PCI sound card with XG)
 Sound Edge SW20 PC (1995, ISA sound card using OPTi Mediachips, Analog Devices SoundPort, and Yamaha YMF278)
 UW10 (USB)
 UW500 (USB)
A/D converters
 AD808 (1988, A/D)
 AD2X (1990, A/D)
 AD8X (1990, A/D & S/PDIF converter)
D/A converters
 DA8X (1990, D/A & S/PDIF converter)
 DA202 (1988, D/A)
 DA824 (1990, D/A)

Pro audio

Mixing consoles

Digital mixing consoles
 PM7 (Rivage) (2018)
 TF1/TF3/TF5 (2016)
 PM10 (Rivage) (2016)
 QL1 /QL5 (2014)
 CL1/CL3/CL5 (2012)
 M7CL (2005/2010)
 LS9 (2006)
 PM1D (2001)
 PM5D (2004)
 DM2000 (2002)
 DM1000 (2003)
 IMX644 (2009, digital installation mixer)
 03D (1997)
 02R / 02R96 (1995/2002)
 01V / 01V96 (1998/2003)
 ProMix01 (1994)
 DMC1000 (1991)
 DMP7/ DMP7-D (1987/1988)
 DMP9-16 (1993)
 DMP11 (1988)
 DMR8 (1990)

Analog mixing consoles

 IM8
GA series
 GA24/12
 GA32/12
PM series
 PM400 series
 PM1000 series
 PM1800A series
 PM2000 series
 PM3000 series
 PM3500 series
 PM4000 series
 PM5000 series

Analog audio mixers

MG series (FX/C/CX/USB)
 MG82CX
 MG10/2 / MG102C
 MG12/4 / MG124C / MG124CX
 MG16/6FX / MG166C / MG166CX / MG166C-USB / MG166CX-USB
 MG206C / MG206C-USB
 MG24/14FX
 MG32/14FX
GF series
MC series
MC-802
MC-1202
MC-1602
MC-2403
MC-3204
MC-3204 II
MR series
MR-842
MX series

Powered mixers

EM series
 EM-80
 EM-90A
 EM-100II
 EM-120
 EM-150 / EM-150IIB
 EM-200 / EM-200B (8in/8mic/2aux/2out, 2×9band GEQ, output:2×200 W/ch)
 EM-300B
EMX box type
 EMX212S / EMX312SC / EMX512SC (12in/6mic/2out, C = comp, 1×SPX, 2×7band GEQ, output:220/300/500 W/ch)
EMX console type
 EMX5014C (14in/8mic/6comp/2out, 1×SPX, 2×9band GEQ, output:2×500 W@4Ω/ch)
 EMX5016CF (16in/12mic/8comp/2aux/2out, 2×SPX, 2×9band GEQ + FRC, output:2×500 W@4Ω/ch)

Outboards

DME digital mixing engines
 DME24N / DME64N (digital mixing engine with network audio interface)
REV digital reverberators
 REV1
 REV5
 REV7
 REV100
 REV500
 SREV1 (convolution reverberator)
SPX digital multi effects
 SPX50D
 SPX90
 SPX900
 SPX990
 SPX1000
 SPX2000
Analog outboards
 Q2031A (31band graphic equalizer)

Software effect processors

Vintage Plug-in Collection
 
 Vintage Channel Strip (2011, EQ & compressors/limiter)
 Vintage Open Deck (2011, tape compression simulator)
 Vintage Stomp Pack (2011, effect stomps)

Studio monitors

 NS-10M / NS-10M Studio (passive)
 HS10W (sub-woofer)
 HS50M
 HS80M
 MSP3 / MSP3 Studio
 MSP5 / MSP5A / MSP5 Studio
 MSP7 Studio
 MSP10 / MSP10M / MSP10ST / MSP10 Studio
 SW10 / SW10 Studio (sub-woofer)
 HS5 / HS7 / HS8 / HS8s (sub-woofer)

Microphones
 MZ101

Home audio

Hi-Fi audio components
Hi-Fi audio amplifiers
 AX-500 Stereo amplifier
 AS-500 Stereo amplifier
 AX-550 Stereo amplifier
 AX-700 Stereo amplifier
 AX-900 Pre/main amplifier
 MX-35 2ch/4ch power amplifier
 M-4 2ch/4ch power amplifier
Hi-Fi CD players
 CDX-560
 CDX-580
Hi-Fi DVD players
 DVD-S30
 DVD-S80
 DVD-S510
 DVD-S520
 DVD-S530
 DVD-S540
 DVD-S550
 DVD-S557
 DVD-S559
 DVD-S657
 DVD-S659
 DVD-S661
 DVD-S663
 DVD-S700
 DVD-S705
 DVD-S795
 DVD-S796
 DVD-S830
 DVD-S840
 DVD-S1200
 DVD-S1500
 DVD-S1700
 DVD-S1800
 DVD-S2300
 DVD-S2500
 DVD-S2700
Hi-Fi cassette decks
 KX-380
 KX-680
Hi-Fi minidisc decks
 MDX-9
 MDX-595
 MDX-596
 MDX-793
 MDX-E300
 MDX-M5
Hi-Fi turntables
 TT-200
 TT-300
 TT-300U
 TT-400
 TT-400U
 TT-500
 TT-500U
Hi-Fi tuners
 TX-930
Hi-Fi receivers
RX-10
RX-330
RX-350
RX-360
RX-385
RX-395
RX-396
RX-397
RX-450
RX-460
RX-485
RX-495
RX-496
RX-500
RX-530
RX-550
RX-570
RX-595
RX-700
RX-730
RX-750
RX-770
RX-777
RX-797
RX-830
RX-900
RX-930
RX-A2A
RX-A4A
RX-A6A
RX-A8A
RX-A550
RX-A660
RX-A670
RX-A680
RX-A700
RX-A710
RX-A720
RX-A730
RX-A740
RX-A750
RX-A760
RX-A770
RX-A780
RX-A800
RX-A810
RX-A820
RX-A830
RX-A840
RX-A850
RX-A860
RX-A870
RX-A1000
RX-A1010
RX-A1020
RX-A1030
RX-A1040
RX-A1050
RX-A1060
RX-A1070
RX-A2000
RX-A2010
RX-A2020
RX-A2030
RX-A2040
RX-A2050
RX-A2060
RX-A2070
RX-A2080
RX-A3000
RX-A3010
RX-A3020
RX-A3030
RX-A3040
RX-A3050
RX-A3060
RX-A3070
RX-A3080
RX-E100
RX-E200
RX-E410
RX-E600
RX-E810
RX-S70
RX-S600
RX-S601
CR-220
CR-400
CR-420
CR-440
CR-450
CR-600
CR-620
CR-640
CR-800
CR-820
CR-840
CR-1000
CR-1020
CR-1040
Hi-Fi equalizers
GE-3
GE-5
GE-20
GE-30
GE-40
GE-60
EQ-32
EQ-50
EQ-70
EQ-500
EQ-550
EQ-630
GQ-1031
GQ-2015
GQ-2031
Q-2031
Hi-Fi VCD changers
VCD-100K
VCD-120K
28 Series
 A-28 amplifier
 K-28 cassette deck
 T-28 tuner
 P-28 turntable
Sound processors
 DSP-1 Digital Soundfield Processor (1985)
 DSP-100 Digital Soundfield Processor
 DSP-E492 Natural Sound AV Processor Amplifier (1997 - 99) 
 Natural Sound
Hi-Fi audio speakers
NS series

 NS-1
 NS-5X
 NS-10
 NS-044
 NS-200
 NS-333
 NS-344
 NS-500
 NS-A100
 NS-700x
 NS-1000
 NS-1000M
 NS-1000x
 NS-1000xw
 NS-2000
 NSX-10000
 Soavo series
YSP series
 YSP-1
 YSP-800
 YSP-900
 YSP-1000
 YSP-1100
 YSP-1400
 YSP-1600
 YSP-2200
 YSP-2500
 YSP-2700
 YSP-3000
 YSP-3300
 YSP-4000
 YSP-4100
 YSP-4300
 YSP-5100
 YSP-5600

Electronics products

Home computers
 YIS PU-I-20 / PU-I-10 (1981, CPU:YM6502+Z8000, Mem:128kB, Graphic:Vector graphics, 512x384@3bit, 12bit color pallet)
MSX/MSX2

 AX-350 / AX-350II
 AX-500
 CX5 / CX5F / CX5M / CX5MII / CX5MII/128 — MSX computers
 CX7/128 / CX7M / CX7M/128 — MSX2 computers
 CX-11
 CX-100
 SX-100
 YIS-303
 YIS-503 / YIS-503II / YIS-503IIR / YIS-503II/64 / YIS-503IIIR / YIS-503IIIR/128 — MSX computers, base model of CX5M
 YIS-513
 YIS-603B
 YIS-604 / YIS-604/128
 YIS-805 / YIS-805/128 / YIS-805/256

Optical disc drives

Networking hardware
Routers
Switches
Firewalls
Software for Networking Products

Semiconductors

Sound chips
 SCSP
 Yamaha Super Intelligent Sound Processor
PSG/SSG
 YM2149 / YM3439  / YMZ294 / YMZ284 / YMZ285 (SSG)
 — PSG variants, adopted by MSX2 (1985) standard.
OPL
 YM3526 (OPL)
 YM2413 (OPLL) — MSX-Music chip, adopted by MSX2+ (1988) & MSX TurboR (1990) standards.
 Y8950 — MSX-Audio chip, used on some MSX (1983) modules.
 YM3812 (OPL2) — used on 1st & 2nd generation Sound Blaster cards for FM sound.
 YMF262 (OPL3) — used on 3rd & 4th generation Sound Blaster cards for FM sound.
 YMF289 (OPL3-L) — low power variant of YMF262, used on some sound cards.
 YMF278 (OPL4) — used in MoonSound for MSX (1994)
OPN
 YM2203 (OPN) — used on arcade systems.
 YM2608 (OPNA) — used on Nec PC-88/98 computer series.
 YM2610 (OPNB) — used on Neo Geo console.
 YM2612 (OPN2) — used in Sega's Mega Drive/Genesis game console and Fujitsu's FM Towns computer series.
 YM3438 (OPN2C) — used in Sega's System C-2, the coin-op version of the Mega Drive. 
 YMF288 (OPN3-L)
 YMF297 (OPN4) — OPN3/OPL3
OPS
 YM21280 (OPS)
 YM21290 (EGS)
Misc
 YM2151 (OPM) — used on arcade systems and on SFG-01 FM Sound Synthesizer Unit for CX5M
 YM2164 (OPP) — used on DX21 / DX27 / DX100 / SFG-05 / FB-01, and Korg DS-8 / Korg 707
 YM3806 (OPQ)
 YM3420 (OPU)
 YMF271(OPX)
 YM2414 (OPZ) — used on DX11 / TX81Z, Korg Z3 guitar synthesizer
 YM2424 (OPZII) — used on V50, a pair of them for 16 note polyphony
 YM2154 (RYP4) — used on Porta Tone PSR-60, PSR-70 and PSR-80.
 YM3301 (RYP6)
 YM2142 (GE8)
 YM2613 (DSG)
 YMU757 (MA-1)
 YMU759 (MA-2)
 YMU762 (MA-3)
 YMU765 (MA-5)
 YMU786 (MA-7) — a mobile phone sound chip with 3D audio effect, etc.
 YMF293 — Formant Singing sound chip used for PLG100-SG.
 YMF7xx series (DS-1) — PC audio chip
 YMF70x~YMF719 — for ISA bus card
 YMF720~... — for PCI bus card
 YMF7x0 series — for on-board or embedded solutions
 YMF7x4 series — for PCI bus standalone adapter
 it supported Yamaha XG level 1, some of MU50 additions, DB50XG compatibilities, Roland GS in TG300B mode, OPL3 FM synthesizer, some emulation of Sound Blaster Pro (stereo 8-bit at 22 kHz) and MPU-401 (MIDI interface).
 YMF724 — 2ch output
 YMF744 — 4ch output
 YMF754 — 5.1/6ch output
 YMP706 — Formant Shaping / FM Synthesis used for Yamaha FS1R and PLG100-DX.
 YMZ263 (MMA)
 YMZ280B (PCMD8)
 YMZ705 (SSGS)
 YMZ732 (SSGS2)
 YMZ733 (SSGS3)
 YMZ735 (FMS)
 YMZ771 (SSG3)
 YMZ774

 YMW820 (NSX-1) (2013) — AudioEngine series sound chip integrating: General MIDI sound with Yamaha XG effects, and either Real Acoustic Sound (RAS) or eVocaloid.
DAC
 YM3012 (DAC-MS) — used with YM2151 (OPM), etc.
 YM3014 (DAC-SS) — used with YM2203 (OPN), YM3812 (OPL2), etc.
 YM3016 (DAC-GD) — used with YM2608 (OPNA), YM2610 (OPNB), etc.
 YAC513 (DAC) — used with YMF278 (OPL4)

Video chips
 YM2217 - used in SG-1000 II
 YM2220 - used in some MSX machines.
 V9938 — MSX-Video chip, adopted by MSX2 (1985) standard.
 V9958 — MSX-Video chip, adopted by MSX2+ & MSX TurboR standards.
 V9990 — used in Graphics9000 extension for MSX (1994)
 YM2602 — used in Sega Master System (1985)
 YM7101 — used in Sega Genesis (1988)

MSX peripheral chips
MSX-Engine
 S1985 — MSX-SYSTEM II chip, for MSX2 System LSI.
 S3527 — MSX-SYSTEM chip, for MSX System LSI.

Sports equipment

Archery

 YB
 YTS II
 YTD
 YTSL
 YTSL II
 YTD II
 EX
 Alpha DX
 Alpha SX
 Alpha EX
 Eolla
 Superfeel Forged 1
 Superfeel Forged 2

Snow ski

 1970s All-Round

See also
 Yamaha Corporation
 Yamaha electric guitar models
 List of Yamaha signature instruments
 EWI (musical instrument)
 Lyricon

Footnotes
notes

media

References

Bibliography
current models

historical models

 

acoustic guitar catalogs

electric guitar catalogs
 archived by VintAxe.com Vintage Guitars (password required)

keyboard catalogs

Further reading

External links

 
Yamaha Corporation products
Sound chips
Electronic musical instruments
 
MIDI controllers